Each entry on this list of common misconceptions is worded as a correction; the misconceptions themselves are implied rather than stated. These entries are concise summaries of the main subject articles, which can be consulted for more detail.

A common misconception is a viewpoint or factoid that is often accepted as true but which is actually false. They generally arise from conventional wisdom (such as old wives' tales), stereotypes, superstitions, fallacies, a misunderstanding of science, or the popularization of pseudoscience. Some common misconceptions are also considered to be urban legends, and they are often involved in moral panics.

Arts and culture

Business
 Legal tender laws in the United States do not state that a private business, a person, or an organization must accept cash for payment, though it must be regarded as valid payment for debts when tendered to a creditor.
 
 Adidas is not an acronym for either "All day I dream about sports", "All day I dream about soccer", or "All day I dream about sex". The company was named after its founder Adolf "Adi" Dassler in 1949. The backronyms were jokes published in 1978 and 1981.
 The common image of Santa Claus (Father Christmas) as a jolly old man in red robes was not created by The Coca-Cola Company as an advertising gimmick. Santa Claus had already taken this form in American popular culture and advertising by the late 19th century, long before Coca-Cola used his image in the 1930s.
 The Chevrolet Nova sold very well in Latin American markets; General Motors did not need to rename the car. While no va does mean "it doesn't go" in Spanish, nova was easily understood to mean "new".
 Netflix was not founded after its co-founder Reed Hastings was charged a $40 late fee by Blockbuster. Hastings made the story up to summarize Netflix's value proposition, and Netflix's founders were actually inspired by Amazon.
 PepsiCo never owned the "6th most powerful navy" in the world after a deal with the Soviet Union. In a 1989 deal, millions of dollars worth of Pepsi were bartered for 20 decommissioned warships which were immediately sold for scrap.

Food and cooking
 Searing does not seal moisture in meat; in fact, it causes it to lose some moisture. Meat is seared to brown it, improving its color, flavor, and texture.
 Twinkies, an American snack cake generally considered as "junk food", have a shelf life of around 45 days, despite the common claim (usually facetious) that they remain edible for decades. Twinkies, with only sorbic acid as an added preservative, normally remain on a store shelf for 7 to 10 days.

 With the exception of some perishables, properly stored foods can safely be eaten past their "expiration" dates. The vast majority of expiration dates in the United States are regulated by state governments and refer to food quality, not safety; the "Use by" date represents the last day the manufacturer warrants the quality of their product.

 Seeds are not the spicy part of chili peppers. In fact, seeds contain a low amount of capsaicin, one of several compounds which induce the hot sensation (pungency) in mammals. The highest concentration of capsaicin is located in the placental tissue (the pith) to which the seeds are attached.
 Turkey meat is not particularly high in tryptophan, and does not cause more drowsiness than other foods. Drowsiness after holiday meals such as Thanksgiving dinner generally comes from overeating.
 Banana-flavored candy was not intended to mimic the taste of a formerly popular variety of banana. The reason banana candy tastes different from bananas is that it is mainly flavored with only one of the many flavors a banana has, isoamyl acetate.

Food history
 
 Fortune cookies are not found in Chinese cuisine, despite their ubiquity in Chinese restaurants in the United States and other Western countries. They were invented in Japan and introduced to the US by the Japanese. In China, they are considered American, and are rare.
 Hydrox is not a knock-off of Oreos. Hydrox, invented in 1908, predates Oreos by four years and outsold it until the 1950s, when Oreos reduced prices and the name "Hydrox" becoming increasingly unappealing due to sounding like a laundry detergent brand.
 George Washington Carver was not the inventor of peanut butter. Peanut butter was used by the Aztecs and Incans as early as the 15th century, and the first peanut butter-related patent was filed by John Harvey Kellogg in 1895. Carver did compile hundreds of uses for peanuts, soybeans, pecans, and sweet potatoes to promote his system of crop rotation. An opinion piece by William F. Buckley Jr. may have been the source of the misconception.
 Potato chips were not invented by a frustrated George Speck in response to a customer, sometimes given as Cornelius Vanderbilt, complaining that his French fries were too thick and not salty enough. Recipes for potato chips existed in cookbooks as early as 1817. The misconception was popularized by a 1973 advertising campaign by the St. Regis Paper Company.
 Spices were not used in the Middle Ages to mask the flavor of rotting meat before refrigeration. Spices were an expensive luxury item; those who could afford them could afford good meat, and there are no contemporaneous documents calling for spices to disguise the taste of bad meat.
 Steak tartare was not invented by Mongol warriors who tenderized meat under their saddles. The dish originated in the early 20th century, in Europe, as a variation on the German-American Hamburg steak.
 Whipped cream was not invented by François Vatel at the Château de Chantilly in 1671; the recipe is attested at least a century earlier in Italy, but the name crème chantilly only in the 19th century.
 Catherine de' Medici and her entourage did not introduce Italian foods to the French royal court and thus create French haute cuisine.

Microwave ovens
 Microwave ovens are not tuned to any specific resonance frequency for water molecules in the food, but rather produce a broad spectrum of frequencies, cooking food via dielectric heating of polar molecules, including water. Several absorption peaks for water lie within the microwave range, and while it is true that these peaks are caused by quantization of molecular energy levels corresponding to a single frequency, water absorbs radiation across the entire microwave spectrum.
 Microwave ovens do not cook food from the inside out. 2.45 GHz microwaves can only penetrate approximately  into most foods. The inside portions of thicker foods are mainly heated by heat conducted from the outer portions.
 Microwave ovens do not cause cancer, as microwave radiation is non-ionizing and therefore does not have the cancer risks associated with ionizing radiation such as X-rays. No studies have found that microwave radiation causes cancer, even with exposure levels far greater than normal radiation leakage.
 Microwaving food does not reduce its nutritive value and may preserve it better than other cooking processes due to shorter cooking times.

Film and television
 Ronald Reagan was never seriously considered for the role of Rick Blaine in the 1942 film classic Casablanca, eventually played by Humphrey Bogart. This belief came from an early studio press release announcing the film's production that used his name to generate interest in the film, but, by the time it had come out, Warner Bros. knew that Reagan was unavailable for any roles in the foreseeable future since he was no longer able to defer his entry into military service. Studio records show that producer Hal B. Wallis had always wanted Bogart for the part.
 Although it is considered the first modern zombie film, George A. Romero's Night of the Living Dead did not identify the undead as zombies. Instead they were referred to as "ghouls". The undead in the film and the subsequent film series also have little in common with the zombies from Haitian mythology, who were corpses reanimated by sorcerers to act as their personal slaves. Romero said the ghouls were inspired by the vampires from I Am Legend, and that at the time he still associated the word "zombie" with the beings from the 1932 film White Zombie, who were closer to their Haitian depictions. The former misconception comes from confusion with its 1978 sequel Dawn of the Dead, where the undead were explicitly called "zombies". 
 Walt Disney Studios' Snow White and the Seven Dwarfs was not the first animated film to be feature-length. El Apóstol, a lost 1917 Argentine silent film that used cutout animation, is considered the first. The confusion comes from Snow White being the first animated feature-length film to use cel animation, which is what most animated films were made with following its release, and from El Apóstol'''s screenings being limited to select theaters in Buenos Aires.

Language

 The pronunciation of coronal fricatives in Spanish did not arise through imitation of a lisping king. Only one Spanish king, Peter of Castile, is documented as having a lisp, and the current pronunciation originated two centuries after his death.
 Sign languages are not the same worldwide. Aside from the pidgin International Sign, each country generally has its own native sign language, and some have more than one.
 Eskimos do not have a disproportionate number of words representing snow in their languages. The myth comes from a misconstruction of Franz Boas' original statement noting that Eskimos had a variety of words for various snow-related concepts; Boas noted that the same was true to a lesser extent for English (see, for example, "blizzard," "flurry" and "squall"). However, Eskimo languages do have many more root words for "snow" than does English.David Robson, New Scientist 2896, December 18 2012, Are there really 50 Eskimo words for snow?, "Yet Igor Krupnik, an anthropologist at the Smithsonian Arctic Studies Center in Washington DC believes that Boas was careful to include only words representing meaningful distinctions. Taking the same care with their own work, Krupnik and others have now charted the vocabulary of about 10 Inuit and Yupik dialects and conclude that there are indeed many more words for snow than in English (SIKU: Knowing Our Ice, 2010). Central Siberian Yupik has 40 such terms, whereas the Inuit dialect spoken in Nunavik, Quebec, has at least 53, including matsaaruti, wet snow that can be used to ice a sleigh's runners, and pukak, for the crystalline powder snow that looks like salt. For many of these dialects, the vocabulary associated with sea ice is even richer."
 The Hopi people do in fact have a concept of time, and the Hopi language does have ways of expressing temporal concepts, though they are organized differently from those in Western languages.
 The Chinese word for "crisis" (危机) is not composed of the symbols for "danger" and "opportunity"; the first does represent danger, but the second instead means "inflection point" (the original meaning of the word "crisis").a. "The Straight Dope: Is the Chinese word for "crisis" a combination of "danger" and "opportunity"?"
b.  The myth was perpetuated mainly by a campaign speech from John F. Kennedy.
 The word "gringo" did not originate during the Mexican–American War (1846–1848), the Venezuelan War of Independence (1811–1823), the Mexican Revolution (1910–1920), or from the American Old West (1865–1890) as a corruption of the English lyrics "green grow" in either "Green Grow the Lilacs" (Irish folk song) or "Green Grow the Rushes, O" (English folk song), as sung by US soldiers or cowboys; nor did it originate during any of these times as a corruption of "Green, go home!", in reference to either the green uniforms of American troops or the color of the U.S. dollar. The word originally simply meant "foreigner", and is probably a corruption of the Spanish word griego for "Greek" (along the lines of the idiom "It's Greek to me").

English language

 "Irregardless" is a word."Irregardless originated in dialectal American speech in the early 20th century... The most frequently repeated remark about it is that "there is no such word." There is such a word, however." Merriam Webster Dictionary  Nonstandard, slang, or colloquial terms used by English speakers are sometimes alleged not to be real words, despite appearing in numerous dictionaries. All words in English became accepted by being commonly used for a certain period of time; thus, there are many vernacular words currently not accepted as part of the standard language, or regarded as inappropriate in formal speech or writing, but the idea that they are not words is a misconception. Other examples of words that are sometimes alleged not to be words include "burglarize", "licit", and "funnest" which appear in numerous dictionaries as English words.
 African American Vernacular English speakers do not simply replace "is" with "be" across all tenses, with no added meaning. In fact, AAVE speakers use "be" to mark a habitual grammatical aspect not explicitly distinguished in Standard English.
 "420" did not originate from the Los Angeles police or penal code for marijuana use. California Penal Code section 420 prohibits the obstruction of access to public land. The use of "420" started in 1971 at San Rafael High School, where a group of students would go to smoke at 4:20 pm.
 The word "crap" did not originate as a back-formation of British plumber Thomas Crapper's aptronymous surname, nor does his name originate from the word "crap". The surname "Crapper" is a variant of "Cropper", which originally referred to someone who harvested crops. The word "crap" ultimately comes from Medieval Latin crappa.
 The word "fuck" did not originate in the Middle Ages as an acronym for either "fornicating under consent of king" or "for unlawful carnal knowledge", either as a sign posted above adulterers in the stocks, or as a sign on houses visible from the road during the Black Death. Nor did it originate as a corruption of "pluck yew" (an idiom falsely attributed to the English for drawing a longbow). It is most likely derived from Middle Dutch or other Germanic languages, where it either meant "to thrust" or "to copulate with" (fokken in Middle Dutch), "to copulate" (fukka in Norwegian), or "to strike, push, copulate" or "penis" (focka and fock respectively in Swedish). Either way, these variations would have been derived from the Indo-European root word -peuk, meaning "to prick".
 The expression "rule of thumb" did not originate from an English law allowing a man to beat his wife with a stick no thicker than his thumb, and there is no evidence that such a law ever existed. The false etymology has been broadly reported in media including Time magazine (1983), The Washington Post (1989) and CNN (1993). The expression originates from the seventeenth century from various trades where quantities were measured by comparison to the width or length of a thumb.
 The word "the" was never pronounced or spelled "ye" in Old or Middle English. The confusion, seen in the common stock phrase "ye olde", derives from the use of the character thorn (þ), which in Middle English represented the sound now represented in Modern English by "th". Early printing presses often lacked types for the letter þ, meaning that "þͤ" and "þe" were substituted with the visually similar "yͤ" and "ye", respectively.
 The anti-Italian slur wop did not originate from an acronym for "without papers" or "without passport"; it is actually derived from the term guappo (roughly meaning thug or "dandy"), from Spanish guapo.

 "Xmas" did not originate as a secular plan to "take the Christ out of Christmas". X represents the Greek letter chi, the first letter of Χριστός (Christós), "Christ" in Greek, as found in the chi-rho symbol ΧΡ since the 4th century. In English, "X" was first used as a scribal abbreviation for "Christ" in 1100; "X'temmas" is attested in 1551, and "Xmas" in 1721.

Law, crime, and military
 It is rarely necessary to wait 24 hours before filing a missing person report. When there is evidence of violence or of an unusual absence, it is important to start an investigation promptly. The UK government advises "You do not have to wait 24 hours before contacting the police." Criminology experts say the first 72 hours in a missing person investigation are the most critical.
 Twinkies were not claimed to be the cause of San Francisco mayor George Moscone's and supervisor Harvey Milk's murders. In the trial of Dan White, the defense successfully argued White's diminished capacity as a result of severe depression. While eating Twinkies was cited as evidence of this depression, it was never claimed to be the cause of the murders.
 The US Armed Forces have generally forbidden military enlistment as a form of deferred adjudication (that is, an option for convicts to avoid jail time) since the 1980s. US Navy protocols discourage the practice, while the other four branches have specific regulations against it.
 The United States does not require police officers to identify themselves as police in the case of a sting or other undercover work, and police officers may lie when engaged in such work. Claiming entrapment as a defense instead focuses on whether the defendant was induced by undue pressure (such as threats) or deception from law enforcement to commit crimes they would not have otherwise committed.

 Crime in the United States decreased between 1993 and 2017. The violent crime rate fell 49% in that period, and the number of gun homicides had decreased during that same time period.
 The First Amendment to the United States Constitution generally prevents only government restrictions on the freedoms of religion, speech, press, assembly, or petition, not restrictions imposed by private individuals or businesses unless they are acting on behalf of the government. Other laws may restrict the ability of private businesses and individuals to restrict the speech of others.
 It is not illegal in the US to shout "fire" in a crowded theater. Although this is often given as an example of speech that is not protected by the First Amendment, it is not now nor has it ever been the law of the land. The phrase originates from Justice Oliver Wendell Holmes, Jr.'s opinion in the United States Supreme Court case Schenck v. United States in 1919, which held that the defendant's speech in opposition to the draft during World War I was not protected free speech. However, that case was not about shouting "fire" and it was later overturned by Brandenburg v. Ohio in 1969.
 Neither the Mafia nor other criminal organizations regularly use or have used cement shoes to drown their victims. There are only two documented cases of this method being used in murders: one in 1964 and one in 2016 (although, in the former, the victim had concrete blocks tied to his legs rather than being enclosed in cement). The French Army did use cement shoes on Algerians killed in death flights during the Algerian War.
 In the United States, a defendant may not have their case dismissed simply because they were not read their Miranda rights at the time of their arrest. Miranda warnings cover the rights of a person when they are taken into custody and then interrogated by law enforcement.Imwinkelried and Blinka, Criminal Evidentiary Foundations, 2d ed. (Lexis 2007)  at 620. If a person is not given a Miranda warning before the interrogation is conducted, statements made by them during the interrogation may not be admissible in a trial. The prosecution may still present other forms of evidence, or statements made during interrogations where the defendant was read their Miranda rights, to get a conviction.
 Chewing gum is not punishable by caning in Singapore. Although importing and selling chewing gum has been illegal in Singapore since 1992, and corporal punishment still being an applicable penalty for certain offenses in the country, the two facts are unrelated; chewing gum-related offenses have always been only subject to fines, and the possession or consumption of chewing gum itself is not illegal.
 Employees of the international police organization Interpol cannot conduct investigations, arrest criminals or use fake passports. They only provide support for international communication between law enforcement agencies of sovereign states.
 Chalk outlines in crime scenes are rare in modern investigations. However, they are popular tropes in literature.

Literature

 Many quotations are incorrect or attributed to people who never uttered them, and quotations from obscure or unknown authors are often attributed to more famous figures. Commonly misquoted individuals include Mark Twain, Albert Einstein, Adolf Hitler, Winston Churchill, Abraham Lincoln, William Shakespeare, Confucius, Sun Tzu, and the Buddha.
 Mary Shelley's 1818 novel Frankenstein is named after the fictional scientist Victor Frankenstein, who created the sapient creature in the novel, not the creature itself, which is never named and is called Frankenstein's monster. However, as later adaptations started to refer to the monster itself as Frankenstein, this usage became well-established, and some no longer regard it as erroneous.

Music

Classical music
 The musical interval tritone was never thought to summon the devil, was not banned by the Catholic Church, and was not associated with devils during the Middle Ages or Renaissance. Early medieval music used the tritone in Gregorian chant for certain modes. Guido of Arezzo was the first theorist to discourage the interval, while rock musicians popularized this myth to justify their use of the tritone.
 Mozart did not die from poisoning and was not poisoned by his colleague Antonio Salieri or anyone else. The false rumor originated soon after Salieri's death and was dramatized in Alexander Pushkin's play Mozart and Salieri (1832), and later in the 1979 Amadeus play by Peter Shaffer and the subsequent 1984 film Amadeus.
 The minuet in G major by Christian Petzold is commonly attributed to Johann Sebastian Bach, although the piece was identified in the 1970s as a movement from a harpsichord suite by Petzold. The misconception stems from Notebook for Anna Magdalena Bach, a book of sheet music by various composers (mostly Bach) in which the minuet is found. Compositions that are doubtful as works of Bach are catalogued as "BWV Anh.", short for "Bach-Werke-Verzeichnis Anhang" ("Bach works catalogue annex"); the minuet is assigned to BWV Anh. 114.
 Listening to Mozart or classical music does not enhance intelligence (or IQ). A study from 1993 reported a short-term improvement in spatial reasoning., p. 611 defines the term as "Slight and transient improvement in spational[sic] reasoning skills detected in normal subjects as a result of exposure to the music of Mozart, specifically his sonata for two pianos (K448)." However, the weight of subsequent evidence supports either a null effect or short-term effects related to increases in mood and arousal, with mixed results published after the initial report in Nature.

 The "Minute Waltz" takes, on average, two minutes to play as originally written. Its name comes from the adjective minute, meaning "small", and not the noun spelled the same.

Popular music
 "Edelweiss" is not the national anthem of Austria, but an original composition created for the 1959 musical The Sound of Music. The Austrian national anthem is "Land der Berge, Land am Strome" ("Land of the Mountains, Land on the River [= Danube]"). The edelweiss is also a national symbol of Austria.
 The Beatles were not the first to experiment with sounds processed through a Leslie speaker.
 The Monkees did not outsell the Beatles' and the Rolling Stones' combined record sales in 1967. Michael Nesmith originated the claim in a 1977 interview as a prank.
 The Rolling Stones were not performing "Sympathy for the Devil" at the 1969 Altamont Free Concert when Meredith Hunter was stabbed to death by a member of the local Hells Angels chapter that was serving as security. While the incident began while the band was performing the song, prompting a brief interruption before the Stones finished it, the actual stabbing occurred later as the band was performing "Under My Thumb". The misconception arose from mistaken reporting in Rolling Stone.
 Concept albums did not begin with rock music in the 1960s. The format had already been employed by singers such as Frank Sinatra in the 1940s and 1950s.
 Phil Collins did not write his 1981 hit "In the Air Tonight" about witnessing someone drowning and then confronting the person in the audience who let it happen. According to Collins himself, it was about his emotions when divorcing from his first wife.

Religion
Buddhism
 The historical Buddha is not known to have been fat. The chubby monk known as the "fat Buddha" or "laughing Buddha" in the West is a 10th-century Chinese Buddhist folk hero by the name of Budai.

Christianity
 Despite numerous uncertainties regarding the life of Jesus and early Christians, virtually all modern scholars agree that Jesus existed historically. The Christ myth theory is rejected as a fringe theory by virtually all scholars of antiquity, and mythicist views are criticized in terms of methodologies, conclusions, and outdated comparisons with mythology.
 Jesus was most likely not born on December 25, when his birth is traditionally celebrated as Christmas. It is more likely that his birth was in either the season of spring or perhaps summer. Also, although the Common Era ostensibly counts the years since his birth, it is unlikely that he was born in either AD 1 or 1 BC, as such a numbering system would imply. Modern historians estimate a date closer to between 6 BC and 4 BC.
 The Bible does not say that exactly three magi came to visit the baby Jesus, nor that they were kings, or rode on camels, or that their names were Caspar, Melchior, and Balthazar, nor what color their skin was. Three magi are inferred because three gifts are described, but the Bible says only that there was more than one magus; still, artistic depictions of the nativity have almost always depicted three magi since the 3rd century. Though they are often depicted as being present for Jesus' birth, the Bible specifies only an upper limit of two years for the interval between the birth and the visit. The association of magi with kings—a connection vehemently opposed by John Calvin as a "ridiculous contrivance"—comes from attempts to tie Old Testament prophecies such as Psalm 72 and chapter 60 of the Book of Isaiah, to the magi; most accounts describe the magi as being astrologers or magicians.Ashby, Chad. "Magi, Wise Men, or Kings? It's Complicated." Christianity Today, December 16, 2016.
 
 The idea that Mary Magdalene was a prostitute before she met Jesus is not found in the Bible or in any of the other earliest Christian writings.
 Paul the Apostle did not change his name from Saul. He was born a Jew, with Roman citizenship inherited from his father, and thus carried both a Hebrew and a Greco-Roman name from birth, as mentioned by Luke in : "...Saul, who also is called Paul...".
 The Roman Catholic dogma of the Immaculate Conception is unrelated to the Christian doctrine that Mary conceived and gave birth to Jesus while remaining a virgin. The Immaculate Conception is the belief that Mary was free of original sin from the moment of her own conception. A less common mistake is to think that the Immaculate Conception means that Mary herself was conceived without sexual intercourse.Hopko, Thomas. The Winter Pascha Chapter 9, Antiochian Orthodox Christian Archdiocese of North America
 Roman Catholic dogma does not say that the pope is either sinless or always infallible. Catholic dogma since 1870 does state that a dogmatic teaching contained in divine revelation that is promulgated by the pope (deliberately, and under certain very specific circumstances; generally called ex cathedra) is free from error, although official invocation of papal infallibility is rare. Most theologians state that canonizations meet the requisites. Otherwise, even when speaking in his official capacity, dogma does not hold that he is always free from error.
 St. Peter's Basilica is not the mother church of Roman Catholicism, nor is it the official seat of the Pope. These equivalent distinctions belong to the Archbasilica of Saint John Lateran, which is located in Rome outside of Vatican City but over which the Vatican has extraterritorial jurisdiction. This also means that St. Peter's is not a cathedral in the literal sense of that word. St. Peter's is, however, used as the principal church for many papal functions.
 Members of the Church of Jesus Christ of Latter-day Saints (LDS Church) no longer practice polygamy. However, a widower may be "sealed" to another wife, and is considered a polygamist in the hereafter. Currently, the LDS Church excommunicates any members who practice "living" polygamy within the organization. Some Mormon fundamentalist sects do practice polygamy.
 Saint Augustine did not say "God created hell for inquisitive people". He actually said: "I do not give the answer that someone is said to have given (evading by a joke the force of the objection), 'He was preparing hell for those who pry into such deep subjects.' ... I do not answer in this way. I would rather respond, 'I do not know,' concerning what I do not know than say something for which a man inquiring about such profound matters is laughed at, while the one giving a false answer is praised." So Augustine is saying that he would not say this and that he does not know the answer to the question.
 The First Council of Nicaea did not establish the books of the Bible. The Old Testament had likely already been established by Hebrew scribes before Christ. The development of the New Testament canon was mostly completed in the third century before the Nicaea Council was convened in 325; it was finalized, along with the deuterocanon, at the Council of Rome in 382.

Islam

 Most Muslim women do not wear a burqa (also transliterated as burka or burkha), which covers the body, head, and face, with a mesh grille to see through. Many Muslim women cover their hair and face (excluding the eyes) with a niqāb, or just their hair with a hijab. However, there are also Muslim women who wear neither face nor head coverings of any kind.
 A fatwa is a non-binding legal opinion issued by an Islamic scholar under Islamic law; it is therefore commonplace for fatwā from different authors to disagree. The misconception that it is a death sentence stems from a fatwā issued by Ayatollah Ruhollah Khomeini of Iran in 1989 where he said that the author Salman Rushdie had earned a death sentence for blasphemy.
 The word "jihad" does not always mean "holy war"; literally, the word in Arabic means "struggle". While there is such a thing as "jihad bil saif", or jihad "by the sword", many modern Islamic scholars usually say that it implies an effort or struggle of a spiritual kind.
 The Quran does not promise martyrs 72 virgins in heaven. It does mention virgin female companions, houri, to all people—martyr or not—in heaven, but no number is specified. The source for the 72 virgins is a hadith in Sunan al-Tirmidhi by Imam Tirmidhi. Hadiths are sayings and acts of the prophet Muhammad as reported by others, not part of the Quran itself.

Judaism

 The forbidden fruit mentioned in the Book of Genesis is never identified as an apple, as widely depicted in Western art. The original Hebrew texts mention only tree and fruit. Early Latin translations use the word mali, which can mean either "of evil" or "of apple". In early Germanic languages the word apple and its cognates usually simply meant "fruit". Jewish scholars have suggested that the fruit could have been wheat, a grape, a fig, or an etrog.
 While tattoos are forbidden by the Book of Leviticus, Jews with tattoos are not barred from being buried in a Jewish cemetery, just as violators of other prohibitions are not barred.

Sports
 The name "golf" is not an acronym for "Gentlemen Only, Ladies Forbidden". It may have come from the Dutch word kolf or kolve, meaning "club", or from the Scottish word goulf or gowf meaning "to strike or cuff".
 Baseball was not invented by Abner Doubleday, nor did it originate in Cooperstown, New York. It is believed to have evolved from other bat-and-ball games such as cricket and rounders and first took its modern form in New York City.

 The black belt in martial arts does not necessarily indicate expert level or mastery. It was introduced for judo in the 1880s to indicate competency at all of the basic techniques of the sport. Promotion beyond 1st dan (the first black belt rank) varies among different martial arts. In judo and derived martial arts such as Brazilian jiu-jitsu, holders of higher master ranks are awarded alternating red and white panels, and the highest grandmasters wear solid red belts. Some other arts such as taekwondo use black belts with a number of gold bars to indicate the holder's dan rank.
 The use of triangular corner flags in English football is not a privilege reserved for those teams that have won an FA Cup in the past as depicted in a scene in the film Twin Town. The Football Association's rules are silent on the subject, and often the decision over what shape flag to use has been up to the individual club's groundskeepers.
 India did not withdraw from the 1950 FIFA World Cup because their squad played barefoot, which was against FIFA regulations. In reality, India withdrew because the country's managing body, the All India Football Federation (AIFF), was insufficiently prepared for the team's participation and gave various reasons for withdrawing, including a lack of funding and prioritizing the Olympics.a. 
b.  The AIFF itself may have been the source of this myth.

Video games
 There is no definitive proof that violent video games cause people to become violent. Some studies have found no link between aggression and violent video games, and the popularity of gaming has coincided with a decrease in youth violence. The moral panic surrounding video games in the 1980s through to the 2000s, alongside several studies and incidents of violence and legislation in many countries, likely contributed to proliferating this idea.
 The so-called "Nuclear Gandhi" glitch, in which peaceful leader Mahatma Gandhi would become unusually aggressive if democracy was adopted, did not exist in either the original Civilization game or Civilization II. The games' designer Sid Meier said it was not possible because of the way the games were programmed. He attributed the origins of the rumor to both a TV Tropes thread and a Know Your Meme entry, while Reddit and a Kotaku article helped popularize it. Gandhi's supposed behavior would later be intentionally added to Civilization V and VI as a reference to the rumor.
 The Japanese government did not pass a law banning Square Enix from releasing the Dragon Quest games on weekdays due to it causing too many schoolchildren to cut class. The only extent of the government's involvement was that the National Diet held hearings over rises in muggings caused by the release of Dragon Quest III. Series executive producer Yuu Miyake said that while the police did complain to the company about the games' releases causing increases in truancies, the decision to change the release dates from Thursdays to Saturdays was on Square Enix's own volition. Dragon Quest X was released on a Thursday, long after the decision had been put in place, further discrediting the claim.
 Space Invaders' release in 1978 did not cause a shortage of ¥100 coins in Japan. The shortage was actually due to the production of ¥100 coins being unusually low that year and silver speculators hoarding or importing these coins en masse for their high silver mix. The game's designer Tomohiro Nishikado has also repeatedly expressed skepticism over the claim. This claim originated from both an advertising campaign by Taito and an erroneous 1980 article in New Scientist, and has since been repeated in the Guinness Book of World Records, The Guardian, and The Ultimate History of Video Games.

History
Ancient
 The Pyramids of Egypt were not constructed with slave labor. Archeological evidence shows that the laborers were a combination of skilled workers and poor farmers working in the off-season, the latter likely recruited for national service, with the participants paid in high-quality food and tax exemption status. The idea that slaves were used originated with the writings of ancient Greek historian Herodotus, and the idea that Israelite slaves were specifically used arose centuries after the pyramids were constructed.

 Ancient Greek and Roman sculptures were originally painted with colors; they appear white today only because the original pigments have deteriorated. Some well-preserved statues still bear traces of their original coloration.
 Tutankhamun's tomb is not inscribed with a curse on those who disturb it. This was a media invention of 20th-century tabloid journalists.
 The ancient Greeks did not use the word "idiot" to disparage people who did not take part in civic life or who did not vote. An  was simply a private citizen as opposed to a government official. Later, the word came to mean any sort of non-expert or layman, then someone uneducated or ignorant, and much later to mean stupid or mentally deficient.

 The Roman salute, in which the arm is fully extended forwards or diagonally with palm down and fingers touching, was not used in ancient Rome. The gesture was first associated with ancient Rome in the 1784 painting The Oath of the Horatii by the French artist Jacques-Louis David, which inspired later salutes, most notably the Nazi salute.

 Vomiting was not a regular part of Roman dining customs. In ancient Rome, the architectural feature called a vomitorium was the entranceway through which crowds entered and exited a stadium, not a special room used for purging food during meals.
 Julius Caesar was not born via caesarean section. Such a procedure would have been fatal to the mother at the time, and Caesar's mother was still alive when Caesar was 45 years old. The name "caesarean" probably comes from the Latin verb caedere 'to cut'.
 The death of the Greek philosopher Hypatia of Alexandria at the hands of a mob of Christian monks in 415 was mainly a result of her involvement in a bitter political feud between her close friend and student Orestes, the Roman prefect of Alexandria, and the bishop Cyril, not her religious views. Her death also had nothing to do with the destruction of the Library of Alexandria, which had likely already ceased to exist centuries before Hypatia was born.
 Scipio Aemilianus did not plow over the city of Carthage and sow it with salt after defeating it in the Third Punic War. An erroneous article in the 1930 edition of Cambridge Ancient History was the source of this claim.

Middle Ages

 The Middle Ages were not "a time of ignorance, barbarism and superstition"; the Church did not place religious authority over personal experience and rational activity; and the term "Dark Ages" is rejected by modern historians.
 While modern life expectancies are much higher than those in the Middle Ages and earlier, adults in the Middle Ages did not die in their 30s or 40s on average. That was the life expectancy at birth, which was skewed by high infant and adolescent mortality. The life expectancy among adults was much higher; a 21-year-old man in medieval England, for example, could expect to live to the age of 64.
 There is no evidence that Viking warriors wore horns on their helmets; this would have also been highly impractical in battle.
 Vikings did not drink out of the skulls of vanquished enemies. This was based on a mistranslation of the skaldic poetic use of ór bjúgviðum hausa (branches of skulls) to refer to drinking horns.
 Vikings did not name Iceland "Iceland" as a ploy to discourage others from settling it. Naddodd and Hrafna-Flóki Vilgerðarson both saw snow and ice on the island when they traveled there, giving the island its name. Greenland, on the other hand, was named in the hope that it would help attract settlers.
 In the tale of King Canute and the tide, the king did not command the tide to reverse in a fit of delusional arrogance. His intent, according to the story, was most likely to prove a point to members of his privy council that no man is all-powerful, and all people must bend to forces beyond their control, such as the tides.
 Marco Polo did not import pasta from China, a misconception that originated with the Macaroni Journal, published by an association of food industries to promote the use of pasta in the United States. Marco Polo describes a food similar to "lasagna" in his Travels, but he uses a term with which he was already familiar.
 There is no evidence that iron maidens were used for torture, or even yet invented, in the Middle Ages. Instead they were pieced together in the 18th century from several artifacts found in museums, arsenals and the like to create spectacular objects intended for (commercial) exhibition.
 Spiral staircases in castles were not designed in a clockwise direction to hinder right-handed attackers. While clockwise spiral staircases are more common in castles than anti-clockwise, they were even more common in medieval structures without a military role, such as religious buildings.
 The plate armor of European soldiers did not stop soldiers from moving around or necessitate a crane to get them into a saddle. They would routinely fight on foot and could mount and dismount without help. However, armor used in tournaments in the late Middle Ages was significantly heavier than that used in warfare, which may have contributed to this misconception.
 Whether chastity belts, devices designed to prevent women from having sexual intercourse, were invented in medieval times is disputed by modern historians. Most existing chastity belts are now thought to be deliberate fakes or anti-masturbatory devices from the 19th and early 20th centuries.

 Medieval European scholars did not believe Earth was flat. Scholars have known the Earth is spherical since at least 500 BC. This myth was created in the 17th century by Protestants to argue against Catholic teachings.
 Medieval cartographers did not regularly write "here be dragons" on their maps. The only maps from this era that have the phrase inscribed on them are the Hunt-Lenox Globe and the Ostrich Egg Globe, next to a coast in Southeast Asia for both of them. Maps instead were more likely to have "here are lions" inscribed. Maps in this period did occasionally have illustrations of mythical beasts like dragons and sea serpents, as well as exotic animals like elephants, on them.
 Christopher Columbus' efforts to obtain support for his voyages were not hampered by belief in a flat Earth, but by valid worries that the East Indies were farther than he realized. In fact, Columbus grossly underestimated the Earth's circumference because of two calculation errors. The myth that Columbus proved the Earth was round was propagated by authors, like Washington Irving in A History of the Life and Voyages of Christopher Columbus.
 Christopher Columbus was not the first European to visit the Americas: Leif Erikson, and possibly other Vikings before him, explored Vinland, which is presumably both Newfoundland and the Gulf of Saint Lawrence as far as northeastern New Brunswick. Ruins at L'Anse aux Meadows prove that at least one Norse settlement was built in Newfoundland, confirming a story in the Saga of Erik the Red. Further, Columbus never reached mainland North America, only mainland South America (1498–1500) and various American islands.
 It is unlikely that the Black Death in Western Eurasia and North Africa was caused by rats. Instead, it is more likely it was caused by human parasites such as fleas and lice.

Early modern
 The Mexica people of the Aztec Empire did not mistake Hernán Cortés and his landing party for gods during Cortés' conquest of the empire. This myth came from Francisco López de Gómara, who never went to Mexico and concocted the myth while working for the retired Cortés in Spain years after the conquest.
 The early settlers of the Plymouth Colony in North America usually did not wear all black, and their capotains (hats) were shorter and rounder than the widely depicted tall hat with a buckle on it. Instead, their fashion was based on that of the late Elizabethan era. The traditional image was formed in the 19th century when buckles were a kind of emblem of quaintness. (The Puritans, who also settled in Massachusetts near the same time, did frequently wear all black.)
 The familiar story that Isaac Newton was inspired to research the nature of gravity by an apple hitting his head is almost certainly apocryphal. All Newton himself ever said was that the idea came to him as he sat "in a contemplative mood" and "was occasioned by the fall of an apple".
 People accused of witchcraft were not burned at the stake during the Salem witch trials. Of the accused, nineteen people convicted of witchcraft were executed by hanging, at least five died in prison, and one man was pressed to death by stones while trying to extract a confession from him.

 Marie Antoinette did not say "let them eat cake" when she heard that the French peasantry were starving due to a shortage of bread. The phrase was first published in Rousseau's Confessions, written when Marie Antoinette was only nine years old and not attributed to her, just to "a great princess". It was first attributed to her in 1843.
 George Washington did not have wooden teeth. His dentures were made of gold, hippopotamus ivory, lead, animal teeth (including horse and donkey teeth), and human teeth, possibly bought from enslaved or poor people.
 The signing of the United States Declaration of Independence did not occur on July 4, 1776. After the Second Continental Congress voted to declare independence on July 2, the final language of the document was approved on July 4, and it was printed and distributed on July 4–5. However, the actual signing occurred on August 2, 1776.
 Benjamin Franklin did not propose that the wild turkey be used as the symbol for the United States instead of the bald eagle. While he did serve on a commission that tried to design a seal after the Declaration of Independence, his proposal was an image of Moses. His objections to the eagle as a national symbol and preference for the turkey were stated in a 1784 letter to his daughter in response to the Society of the Cincinnati's use of the former; he never expressed that sentiment publicly.
 There was never a bill to make German the official language of the United States that was defeated by one vote in the House of Representatives, nor has one been proposed at the state level. In 1794, a petition from a group of German immigrants was put aside on a procedural vote of 42 to 41, that would have had the government publish some laws in German. This was the basis of the Muhlenberg legend, named after the Speaker of the House at the time, Frederick Muhlenberg, who was of German descent and abstained from this vote.

Modern

 Napoleon Bonaparte was not especially short for a Frenchman of his time. He was the height of an average French male in 1800, but short for an aristocrat or officer. There are competing explanations for why he was nicknamed le Petit Caporal (The Little Corporal), one possibility being that the moniker was used as a term of endearment. Napoleon was often accompanied by his imperial guard, who were selected for their height, and this may have contributed to a perception that he was comparatively short.
 The nose of the Great Sphinx of Giza was not shot off by Napoleon's troops during the French campaign in Egypt (1798–1801); it has been missing since at least the 10th century. 
 Cinco de Mayo is not Mexico's Independence Day, but the celebration of the Mexican Army's victory over the French in the Battle of Puebla on May 5, 1862. Mexico's Declaration of Independence from Spain in 1810 is celebrated on September 16.
 Victorian-era doctors did not invent the vibrator to cure female "hysteria" by triggering orgasm.

 Albert Einstein did not fail mathematics classes in school. Einstein remarked, "I never failed in mathematics.... Before I was fifteen I had mastered differential and integral calculus." Einstein did, however, fail his first entrance exam into the Swiss Federal Polytechnic School (ETH) in 1895, when he was two years younger than his fellow students, but scored exceedingly well in the mathematics and science sections, then passed on his second attempt.
 Alfred Nobel did not omit mathematics in the Nobel Prize due to a rivalry with mathematician Gösta Mittag-Leffler, as there is little evidence the two ever met, nor was it because Nobel's spouse had an affair with a mathematician, as Nobel was never married. The more likely explanation is that Nobel believed mathematics was too theoretical to benefit humankind, as well as his personal lack of interest in the field .
 The Italian dictator Benito Mussolini did not "make the trains run on time". Much of the repair work had been performed before he and the Fascist Party came to power in 1922. Moreover, the Italian railways' supposed adherence to timetables was more propaganda than reality.
 There is no evidence of Polish cavalry mounting a brave but futile charge against German tanks using lances and sabers during the German invasion of Poland in 1939. This story may have originated from German propaganda efforts following the charge at Krojanty, in which a Polish cavalry brigade surprised German infantry in the open, and successfully charged and dispersed them, until driven off by armored cars. While Polish cavalry still carried the saber for such opportunities, they were trained to fight as highly mobile, dismounted cavalry (dragoons) and issued with light anti-tank weapons.
 During the occupation of Denmark by the Nazis during World War II, King Christian X of Denmark did not thwart Nazi attempts to identify Jews by wearing a yellow star himself. Jews in Denmark were never forced to wear the Star of David. The Danish resistance did help most Jews flee the country before the end of the war.

 Leon Trotsky was not killed with an ice pick, (a small, awl-like tool for chipping ice) but with an ice axe – a larger tool used for mountaineering.
 US President John F. Kennedy's words "" are standard German for "I am a Berliner (citizen of Berlin)." It is not true that by not leaving out the indefinite article "ein", he changed the meaning of the sentence from the intended "I am a citizen of Berlin" to "I am a Berliner", a Berliner being a type of German pastry, similar to a jelly donut, amusing Germans. Furthermore, the pastry which is known by many names in Germany was not then nor is it now commonly called "Berliner" in the Berlin area.
 Although popularly known as the "red telephone", the Moscow–Washington hotline was never a telephone line, nor were red phones used. The first implementation of the hotline used teletype equipment, which was replaced by facsimile (fax) machines in 1988. Since 2008, the hotline has been a secure computer link over which the two countries exchange email. Moreover, the hotline links the Kremlin to the Pentagon, not the White House.
 Not all skinheads are white supremacists; many skinheads identify as left-wing or apolitical, and many oppose racism, such as the Skinheads Against Racial Prejudice. The subculture originated from the 1950s British working class, whose members were influenced by both black and Jamaican music and subcultures, particularly the Jamaican rude boy subculture and the mods subculture. As a result, many initial skinheads were either black or West Indian. The association between skinheads and white supremacy came about in the 1970s and 1980s as a result of far-right groups like the National Front and the British Movement recruiting from the subculture to obtain grassroots support, some punk bands within the movement adopting Nazi imagery for shock value, and an incident in July 1981 when skinheads attending a concert in a predominantly South Asian neighborhood in London rioted and attacked several Asian-owned stores.
 Russia does not explicitly have an independence day, nor is there a date that officially commemorates such an occasion. There have been many states that predate the current Russian Federation, and the public holiday of Russia Day only celebrates the establishment of present-day Russia, which occurred on June 12, 1990. Both Russians and foreigners commonly refer to Russia Day as "Russia's Independence Day" since it reflects the break from the Soviet Union that held dominion over Russia from 1922 to 1991.

United States

 The Emancipation Proclamation did not free all slaves in the United States, nor did it make slavery illegal in the United States; the Proclamation applied in the ten states that were still in rebellion in 1863, and thus did not cover the nearly 500,000 slaves in the slave-holding border states (Missouri, Kentucky, Maryland or Delaware) that had not seceded. Various exemptions in the Proclamation for Tennessee, Virginia, and Louisiana left an additional 300,000 slaves unemancipated. Such slaves were freed later by separate state and federal actions.Harrison (2001), Lawfulness of the Reconstruction Amendments, p. 390. (See also: Abolition of slavery timeline)
 Likewise, June 19 or "Juneteenth" is the anniversary of the announcement that the Union army would be enforcing the Emancipation Proclamation on June 19, 1865, freeing slaves in Texas (which was the last Confederate state in rebellion), not the United States at large. The Thirteenth Amendment, ratified and proclaimed in December 1865, was the article that made slavery illegal in the United States nationwide.
 Abraham Lincoln did not write his Gettysburg Address speech on the back of an envelope on his train ride to Gettysburg. The speech was substantially complete before Lincoln left Washington for Gettysburg.
 The Alaska Purchase was generally popular in the United States, both among the public and the press. The opponents of the purchase who characterized it as "Seward's Folly", alluding to William H. Seward, the Secretary of State who negotiated it, represented a minority opinion at the time.
 Cowboy hats were not initially popular in the Western American frontier, with derby or bowler hats being the typical headgear of choice. Heavy marketing of the Stetson "Boss of the Plains" model in the years following the American Civil War was the primary driving force behind the cowboy hat's popularity, with its characteristic dented top not becoming standard until near the end of the 19th century.
 The Great Chicago Fire of 1871 was not caused by Mrs. O'Leary's cow kicking over a lantern. A newspaper reporter later admitted to having invented the story to make colorful copy.
 There is no evidence that Frederic Remington, on assignment to Cuba in 1897, telegraphed William Randolph Hearst, "There will be no war. I wish to return," and that Hearst responded, "Please remain. You furnish the pictures, and I'll furnish the war". The anecdote was originally included in a book by James Creelman, and probably never happened.
 The electrocution of Topsy the Elephant was not an anti-alternating current demonstration organized by Thomas A. Edison during the war of the currents. Edison was never at Luna Park, and the electrocution of Topsy took place ten years after the war of currents. This myth may stem from the fact that the recording of the event was produced by the Edison film company.
 Immigrants' last names were not Americanized (voluntarily, mistakenly, or otherwise) upon arrival at Ellis Island. Officials there kept no records other than checking ship manifests created at the point of origin, and there was simply no paperwork that would have let them recast surnames, let alone any law. At the time in New York, anyone could change the spelling of their name simply by using that new spelling. These names are often referred to as an "Ellis Island Special".
 Prohibition did not make drinking alcohol illegal in the United States. The Eighteenth Amendment and the subsequent Volstead Act prohibited the production, sale, and transport of "intoxicating liquors" within the United States, but their possession and consumption were never outlawed.

 Distraught stockbrokers did not jump to their deaths after the Wall Street Crash of 1929. The source of this myth seems to be Winston Churchill's account of a man jumping off the Savoy-Plaza Hotel, just one floor below where Churchill was staying. In fact, he was a German tourist, and his fall was reported as accidental.
 There was no widespread outbreak of panic across the United States in response to Orson Welles's 1938 radio adaptation of H.G. Wells's The War of the Worlds. Only a very small share of the radio audience was listening to it, but newspapers played up isolated reports of incidents and increased emergency calls being eager to discredit radio as a competitor for advertising. Both Welles and CBS, which had initially reacted apologetically, later came to realize that the myth benefited them and actively embraced it in later years.
 American pilot Kenneth Arnold did not use the term "flying saucer" when describing a 1947 UFO sighting at Mount Rainier, Washington. Kenneth frequently maintained he was misquoted, and The East Oregonian, the first newspaper to report on the incident, merely quoted him as saying the objects "flew like a saucer" and were "flat like a pie pan". The attribution may have come from a reporter at the United Press International misinterpreting his descriptions, with newspapers and news agencies like the Associated Press subsequently using "flying saucers" in sensationalist headlines.
 U.S. Senator George Smathers never gave a speech to a rural audience describing his opponent, Claude Pepper, as an "extrovert" whose sister was a "thespian", in the apparent hope they would confuse them with similar-sounding words like "pervert" and "lesbian". Smathers offered US$10,000 to anyone who could prove he had made the speech; it was never claimed.
 Rosa Parks was not sitting in the front ("white") section of the bus during the event that made her famous and incited the Montgomery bus boycott. Rather, she was sitting in the front of the back ("colored") section of the bus, where African Americans were expected to sit, and rejected an order from the driver to vacate her seat in favor of a white passenger when the "white" section of the bus had become full.
 The African-American intellectual and activist W. E. B. Du Bois did not renounce his U.S. citizenship while living in Ghana shortly before his death.a. 
b. 
c.  In early 1963, his membership in the Communist Party and support for the Soviet Union led the U.S. State Department not to renew his passport while he was already in Ghana. After leaving the embassy, he stated his intention to renounce his citizenship in protest. But while he took Ghanaian citizenship, he never actually renounced his American citizenship.
 When Kitty Genovese was murdered outside her apartment in 1964, there were not 37 neighbors standing idly by and watching who failed to call the police until after she was dead, as initially reported to widespread public outrage that persisted for years and even became the basis of a theory in social psychology. In fact, witnesses only heard brief portions of the attack and did not realize what was occurring, and only six or seven actually saw anything. One witness who called the police said, "I didn't want to get involved", an attitude later attributed to all the neighbors.
 While it was praised by one architectural magazine before it was built as "the best high apartment of the year", the Pruitt–Igoe housing project in St. Louis, Missouri, considered to epitomize the failures of urban renewal in American cities after it was demolished in the early 1970s, never won any awards for its design. The architectural firm that designed the buildings did win an award for an earlier St. Louis project, which may have been confused with Pruitt–Igoe.
 There is little contemporary documentary evidence for the notion that US Vietnam veterans were spat upon by anti-war protesters upon return to the United States. This belief was detailed in some biographical accounts and was later popularized by films such as Rambo.
 Women did not burn their bras outside the Miss America contest in 1969 as a protest in support of women's liberation. They did symbolically throw bras in a trash can, along with other articles seen as emblematic of the woman's position in American society such as mops, make-up, and high-heeled shoes. The myth of bra burning came when a journalist hypothetically suggested that women may in future do so, as men of the era burned their draft cards.
 Despite being the origin of the phrase "drinking the Kool-Aid", Kool-Aid was not used for the potassium cyanide-fruit punch mix ingested as part of the Jonestown massacre. A similar product, Flavor-Aid, was used instead.

Science, technology, and mathematics

Astronomy and spaceflight
 There is no scientific evidence that the motion of stars, planets, and other celestial bodies influences the fates of humans, and astrology has repeatedly been shown to have no explanatory power in predicting future events.
 Astronauts appear to be weightless because they are in free fall, not because they are so far away from the Earth that its gravitational pull is negligible. For example, on the International Space Station the Earth's gravity is nearly 90% as strong as at the surface. Objects orbiting in space would not remain in orbit if not for the gravitational force, and gravitational fields extend even into the depths of intergalactic space."The G's in the Machine", NASA, see "Editor's note #2"

 The "dark side of the Moon" receives about the same amount of light from the Sun as does the near side of the Moon. The word "dark" does not mean that it never receives light, but rather that it was unknown since the same side of the Moon is always facing the Earth. Until humans sent spacecraft around the Moon, this area had never been seen.
 Black holes have the same gravitational effects as any other equal mass in their place. They will draw objects nearby towards them, just as any other celestial body does, except at very close distances to the black hole—comparable to its Schwarzschild radius. If, for example, the Sun were replaced by a black hole of equal mass, the orbits of the planets would be essentially unaffected. A black hole can pull a substantial inflow of surrounding matter, but only if the star from which it formed was already doing so.

 Seasons are not caused by the Earth being closer to the Sun in the summer than in the winter, but by the effects of Earth's 23.4-degree axial tilt. Each hemisphere is tilted towards the Sun in its respective summer (July in the Northern Hemisphere and January in the Southern Hemisphere), resulting in longer days and more direct sunlight, with the opposite being true in the winter. Earth reaches the point in its orbit closest to the Sun in January, and it reaches the point farthest from the Sun in July, so the slight contribution of orbital eccentricity opposes the temperature trends of the seasons in the Northern Hemisphere. Orbital eccentricity can influence temperatures, but on Earth, this effect is small and is more than counteracted by other factors.
 When a meteor or spacecraft enters the atmosphere, the heat of entry is not (primarily) caused by friction, but by adiabatic compression of air in front of the object.
 Egg balancing is possible on every day of the year, not just the vernal equinox, and there is no relationship between any astronomical phenomenon and the ability to balance an egg.
 The Fisher Space Pen was not commissioned by NASA at a cost of millions of dollars, while the Soviets used pencils. It was independently developed by Paul C. Fisher, founder of the Fisher Pen Company, with $1 million of his own funds. NASA tested and approved the pen for space use, then purchased 400 pens at $6 per pen. The Soviet Union subsequently also purchased the space pen for its Soyuz spaceflights.
 Tang, Velcro, and Teflon were not spun off from technology originally developed by NASA for spaceflight, though many other products (such as memory foam and space blankets) were.
 The Sun is actually white rather than yellow. It is atmospheric scattering that causes the Sun to look yellow, orange, or red at sunrise and sunset.

 The Great Wall of China is not, as is claimed, the only human-made object visible from space or from the Moon. None of the Apollo astronauts reported seeing any specific human-made object from the Moon, and even Earth-orbiting astronauts can see it only with magnification. City lights, however, are easily visible on the night side of Earth from orbit.
 The Big Bang model does not fully explain the origin of the universe. It does not describe how energy, time, and space were caused, but rather it describes the emergence of the present universe from an ultra-dense and high-temperature initial state.

Biology

Vertebrates
 Old elephants near death do not leave their herd to go to an "elephants' graveyard" to die.

 Bulls are not enraged by the color red, used in capes by professional matadors. Cattle are dichromats, so red does not stand out as a bright color. It is not the color of the cape, but the perceived threat by the matador that incites it to charge.
 Lemmings do not engage in mass suicidal dives off cliffs when migrating. The scenes of lemming suicides in the 1958 Disney documentary film White Wilderness, which popularized this idea, were completely fabricated. The misconception itself is much older, dating back to at least the late 19th century, though its exact origins are uncertain.
 Dogs do not sweat by salivating. Dogs actually do have sweat glands and not only on their tongues; they sweat mainly through their footpads. However, dogs do primarily regulate their body temperature through panting .
 Dogs do not consistently age seven times as quickly as humans. Aging in dogs varies widely depending on the breed; certain breeds, such as giant dog breeds and English bulldogs, have much shorter lifespans than average. Most dogs age consistently across all breeds in the first year of life, reaching adolescence by one year old; smaller and medium-sized breeds begin to age more slowly in adulthood.
 The phases of the Moon have no effect on the vocalizations of wolves, and wolves do not howl at the moon. Wolves howl to assemble the pack usually before and after hunts, to pass on an alarm particularly at a den site, to locate each other during a storm, while crossing unfamiliar territory, and to communicate across great distances.
 There is no such thing as an "alpha" in a wolf pack. An early study that coined the term "alpha wolf" had only observed unrelated adult wolves living in captivity. In the wild, wolf packs operate like families: parents are in charge until the young grow up and start their own families, and younger wolves do not overthrow an "alpha" to become the new leader.
 Bats are not blind. While about 70% of bat species, mainly in the microbat family, use echolocation to navigate, all bat species have eyes and are capable of sight. In addition, almost all bats in the megabat or fruit bat family cannot echolocate and have excellent night vision.
 Contrary to the allegory about the boiling frog, frogs die immediately when cast into boiling water, rather than leaping out; furthermore, frogs will attempt to escape cold water that is slowly heated past their critical thermal maximum.
 The memory span of goldfish is much longer than just a few seconds. It is up to a few months long.. 2004 season, Episode 12. MythBusters. Discovery.com. February 22, 2004.
 Sharks can have cancer. The misconception that sharks do not get cancer was spread by the 1992 book Sharks Don't Get Cancer, which was used to sell extracts of shark cartilage as cancer prevention treatments. Reports of carcinomas in sharks exist, and current data do not support any conclusions about the incidence of tumors in sharks.
 Great white sharks do not mistake human divers for seals, nor other pinnipeds. When attacking pinnipeds, the shark surfaces quickly and attacks violently. In contrast, attacks on humans are slower and less violent: the shark charges at a normal pace, bites, and swims off. Great white sharks have efficient eyesight and color vision; the bite is not predatory, but rather for identification of an unfamiliar object.
 Snake jaws cannot unhinge. The posterior end of the lower jaw bones contains a quadrate bone, allowing jaw extension. The anterior tips of the lower jaw bones are joined by a flexible ligament allowing them to bow outwards, increasing the mouth gape.
 Tomato juice and tomato sauce are ineffective at neutralizing the odor of a skunk; it only appears to work due to olfactory fatigue. For dogs that get sprayed, The Humane Society of the United States recommends using a mixture of dilute hydrogen peroxide (3%), baking soda, and dishwashing liquid.
 Porcupines do not shoot their quills. They can detach, and porcupines will deliberately back into attackers to impale them, but their quills do not project.
 Mice do not have a special appetite for cheese, and will eat it only for lack of better options; they actually favor sweet, sugary foods. The myth may have come from the fact that before refrigeration, cheese was usually stored outside and was therefore an easy food for mice to reach.
 There is no credible evidence that the candiru, a South American parasitic catfish, can swim up a human urethra if one urinates in the water in which it lives. The sole documented case of such an incident, written in 1997, has been heavily criticized upon peer review, and this phenomenon is now largely considered a myth.
 Piranhas do not eat only meat but are omnivorous, and they only swim in schools to defend themselves from predators and not to attack. They very rarely attack humans, only when under stress and feeling threatened, and even then, bites typically only occur on hands and feet.
 The hippopotamus does not produce pink milk. Hipposudoric acid, a red pigment found in hippo skin secretions, does not affect the color of their milk, which is white or beige.
 Pacus, South American fish related to piranhas, do not attack or feed on human testicles. This myth originated from a misinterpreted joke in a 2013 report of a pacu being found in Øresund, the strait between Sweden and Denmark, which claimed that the fish ate "nuts".
 The Pacific tree frog is the only frog species that makes a "ribbit" sound. The misconception that all frogs, or at least all those found in North America, make this sound comes from its extensive use in Hollywood films.
 A human touching or handling eggs or baby birds will not cause the adult birds to abandon them. The same is generally true for other animals having their young touched by humans as well, with the possible exception of rabbits (as rabbits will sometimes abandon their nest after an event they perceive as traumatizing).
 Rice does not cause birds to die by inflating their stomachs until they burst. Birds do eat wild rice, though some species avoid it. This common misconception has often led to weddings using millet, confetti, or other materials to shower the newlyweds as they leave the ceremony, instead of the throwing of rice that is traditional in some places.

 The bold, powerful cry commonly associated with the bald eagle in popular culture is actually that of a red-tailed hawk. Bald eagle vocalizations are much softer and chirpy, and bear far more resemblance to the calls of gulls.
 Ostriches do not stick their heads in the sand to hide from enemies or to sleep. This misconception's origins are uncertain but it was probably popularized by Pliny the Elder (23–79 CE), who wrote that ostriches "imagine, when they have thrust their head and neck into a bush, that the whole of their body is concealed".
 A duck's quack actually does echo, although the echo may be difficult to hear for humans under some circumstances. Despite this, a British panel show compiling interesting facts has been given the name Duck Quacks Don't Echo.
 60 common starlings were released in 1890 into New York's Central Park by Eugene Schieffelin, but there is no evidence that he was trying to introduce every bird species mentioned in the works of William Shakespeare into North America. This claim has been traced to an essay in 1948 by naturalist Edwin Way Teale, whose notes appear to indicate that it was speculation.
 The skin of a chameleon is not adapted solely for camouflage purposes, nor can a chameleon change its skin colour to match any background.  

Invertebrates
 Not all earthworms become two worms when cut in half. Only a limited number of earthworm species are capable of anterior regeneration.
 Houseflies have an average lifespan of 20 to 30 days, not 24 hours. The misconception may arise from confusion with mayflies, which, in some species, have an adult lifespan of as little as 5 minutes. 
 The daddy longlegs spider (Pholcidae) is not the most venomous spider in the world and their fangs are capable of piercing human skin, but the tiny amount of venom they carry causes only a mild burning sensation for a few seconds. Other species such as harvestmen, crane flies, and male mosquitoes are called daddy longlegs in some regional dialects, and share the misconception of being highly venomous but unable to pierce the skin of humans.

 People do not swallow large numbers of spiders during sleep. A sleeping person makes noises that warn spiders of danger.

 Female praying mantises do not always eat the males during mating (although they sometimes do).

 It is not true that aerodynamic theory predicts that bumblebees should not be able to fly; the physics of insect flight is quite well understood. The misconception appears to come from a calculation based on a fixed-wing aircraft mentioned in a 1934 book.
 Earwigs are not known to purposely climb into external ear canals, though there have been anecdotal reports of earwigs being found in the ear. The name may be a reference to the appearance of the hindwings, which are unique and distinctive among insects, and resemble a human ear when unfolded.
 While certainly critical to the pollination of many plant species, European honey bees are not essential to human food production, despite claims that without their pollination, humanity would starve or die out "within four years". In fact, many important crops need no insect pollination at all. The ten most important crops, accounting for 60% of all human food energy, all fall into this category.
 Ticks do not jump nor fall from trees onto their hosts. Instead, they lie in wait to grasp and climb onto any passing host or otherwise trace down hosts via, for example, olfactory stimuli, the host's body heat, or carbon dioxide in the host's breath.
 Though they are often called "white ants", termites are not ants, nor are they closely related to ants. Termites are actually highly derived eusocial cockroaches.
 While cockroaches have a much higher radiation resistance than vertebrates, they are not immune to radiation poisoning, nor are they exceptionally radiation-resistant compared to other insects. Cockroaches would not be the only organisms capable of surviving in an environment contaminated with nuclear fallout. Since not all cockroaches molt at the same time, during which their dividing cells would be most vulnerable to radiation effects, many would be unaffected by an acute burst of radiation, although lingering and more acute radiation would still be harmful. Cockroaches are not capable of surviving a direct nuclear blast.
 Applying urine to jellyfish stings does not relieve pain. A centuries-old old wives' tale, the idea is said to have been popularized by an episode of Friends.

Plants
 Carnivorous plants do survive without food. Catching insects, however, supports their growth.
 Poinsettias are not highly toxic to humans or cats. While it is true that they are mildly irritating to the skin or stomach, and may sometimes cause diarrhea and vomiting if eaten, they rarely cause serious medical problems.

 Sunflowers do not always point to the Sun. Flowering sunflowers face a fixed direction (often east) all day long, but do not necessarily face the Sun. However, in an earlier developmental stage, before the appearance of flower heads, the immature buds do track the Sun (a phenomenon called heliotropism), and the fixed alignment of the mature flowers toward a certain direction is often the result.
 Mushrooms, molds, and other fungi are not plants, despite similarities in their morphology and lifestyle. The historical classification of fungi as plants is defunct, and although they are still commonly included in botany curricula and textbooks, modern molecular evidence shows that fungi are more closely related to animals than to plants.

Evolution and paleontology

 The word theory in "the theory of evolution" does not imply scientific doubt regarding its validity; the concepts of theory and hypothesis have specific meanings in a scientific context. While theory in colloquial usage may denote a hunch or conjecture, a scientific theory is a set of principles that explains an observable phenomenon in natural terms. "Scientific fact and theory are not categorically separable", and evolution is a theory in the same sense as germ theory or the theory of gravitation.
 The theory of evolution does not attempt to explain the origin of life or the origin and development of the universe. The theory of evolution deals primarily with changes in successive generations over time after life has already originated. The scientific model concerned with the origin of the first organisms from organic or inorganic molecules is known as abiogenesis, and the prevailing theory for explaining the early development of the universe is the Big Bang model.
 Evolution is not a progression from inferior to superior organisms, and it also does not necessarily result in an increase in complexity. Evolution through natural selection only causes organisms to become more fit for their environment. A population can evolve to become simpler or to have a smaller genome, and atavistic ancestral genetic traits can reappear after having been lost through evolutionary change in previous generations. Biological devolution or de-evolution is a misnomer, not only because it implies that organisms can only evolve backward or forward, but also because it implies that evolution may cause organisms to evolve in the "wrong" direction. see also biological devolution.
 The phrase "survival of the fittest" refers to biological fitness, not physical fitness. Biological fitness is the quantitative measure of individual reproductive success, e.g. the tendency of lineages containing individuals that produce more offspring in a particular environment to persist and thrive in that environment. Further, while the related concepts of "survival of the fittest" and "natural selection" are often used interchangeably, they are not the same: natural selection is not the only form of selection that determines biological fitness (see sexual selection, fecundity selection, viability selection, and artificial selection).Hartl, D. L. (1981) A Primer of Population Genetics 
 Evolution does not "plan" to improve an organism's fitness to survive. The misconception is encouraged as it is common shorthand for biologists to speak of a purpose as a concise form of expression (sometimes called the "metaphor of purpose"); it is less cumbersome to say "Dinosaurs may have evolved feathers for courtship" than "Feathers may have been selected for when they arose as they gave dinosaurs a selective advantage during courtship over their non-feathered rivals".
 Mutations are not entirely random, nor do they occur at the same frequency everywhere in the genome. Certain regions of an organism's genome will be more or less likely to undergo mutation depending on the presence of DNA repair mechanisms and other mutation biases. For instance, in a study on Arabidopsis thaliana, biologically important regions of the plant's genome were found to be protected from mutations, and beneficial mutations were found to be more likely, i.e. mutation was "non-random in a way that benefits the plant".
 Although the word dinosaur can be used pejoratively to describe something that is becoming obsolete due to failing to adapt to changing conditions, non-avian dinosaurs themselves did not go extinct from inability to adapt to environmental change as was initially theorized. Moreover, not all dinosaurs are extinct (see below).

 Birds are theropod dinosaurs, and consequently dinosaurs are not extinct. The word dinosaur is commonly used to refer only to non-avian dinosaurs, reflecting an outdated conception of the ancestry of avian dinosaurs, the birds. The evolutionary origin of birds was an open question in paleontology for over a century, but the modern scientific consensus is that birds evolved from small feathered theropods in the Jurassic. Not all dinosaur lineages were cut short at the end of the Cretaceous during the Cretaceous–Paleogene extinction event, and some avian theropods survive as part of the modern fauna.

 Mosasaurs, ichthyosaurs, plesiosaurs, and other aquatic Mesozoic diapsids were not dinosaurs. Despite their many cultural depictions as 'swimming dinosaurs,' mosasaurs were actually lizards, and ichthyosaurs and plesiosaurs were even more distantly related to dinosaurs. Though some dinosaurs were or are semiaquatic, (Hesperornis, Spinosaurus, auks, penguins), none are known to have been fully marine.

 Dimetrodon is often mistakenly called a dinosaur or considered to be a contemporary of dinosaurs in popular culture, but it became extinct some 40 million years before the first appearance of dinosaurs. Being a synapsid, Dimetrodon is actually more closely related to mammals than to dinosaurs, birds, lizards, or other diapsids.
 Pterosaurs (sometimes referred to using the informal term 'pterodactyls') are often called "flying dinosaurs" by popular media and the general public, but while pterosaurs were closely related to dinosaurs, dinosaurs are defined as the descendants of the last common ancestor of the Saurischia and the Ornithischia, which excludes the pterosaurs.
 Humans and non-avian dinosaurs did not coexist. The last of the non-avian dinosaurs died  million years ago in the course of the Cretaceous–Paleogene extinction event, whereas the earliest members of genus Homo (humans) evolved between 2.3 and 2.4 million years ago. This places a 63-million-year expanse of time between the last non-avian dinosaurs and the earliest humans. Humans did coexist with woolly mammoths and saber-toothed cats—mammals often erroneously depicted alongside non-avian dinosaurs. Humans and dinosaurs, specifically birds, did (and do) coexist.
 Fossil fuels do not originate from dinosaur fossils. Petroleum is formed when algae and zooplankton die and sink in anoxic conditions to be buried on the ocean floor without being decomposed by aerobic bacteria, and only a tiny amount of the world's deposits of coal possibly contain dinosaur fossils; the vast majority of coal is fossilized plant matter.Strauss, Bob. "Does Oil Come From Dinosaurs?" ThoughtCo, September 1, 2021, https://thoughtco.com/does-oil-come-from-dinosaurs-1092003.Cleal, C. J. & Thomas, B. A. (2005). "Palaeozoic tropical rainforests and their effect on global climates: is the past the key to the present?" Geobiology, 3, p. 13-31. 
 Mammals did not evolve from any modern group of reptiles; rather, mammals descend from a Reptiliomorph, "reptile-like," ancestor. The term reptile is problematic, since its conventional usage unnaturally excludes birds and mammals, and the modern consensus is that the reptiles are not a natural group. After the first fully terrestrial tetrapods evolved, one of their lineages split into the synapsids (the line leading to mammals) and the diapsids (the line leading to lizards, snakes, birds and other dinosaurs, and crocodiles). The synapsids and the diapsids diverged about 320 million years ago, in the mid-Carboniferous period. Only later, in the Triassic, did the modern diapsid groups (the lepidosaurs and the archosaurs) emerge and diversify. The mammals themselves are the only survivors of the synapsid line.

 Humans and other apes are Old World monkeys. The word 'monkey' is often used colloquially to describe only those simians which possess tails, thus excluding Barbary apes and true apes, but this distinction is taxonomically invalid. While apes were traditionally thought to be a sister group to monkeys, modern paleontological and molecular evidence shows that apes are deeply nested within the monkey family tree. Old World monkeys like baboons are more closely related to all apes than they are to all New World monkeys, and extinct Old World monkeys like Aegyptopithecus predate the split between apes and all other extant Old World monkeys. There is a concerted social and religious effort to deny evidence which connects humans to their simian ancestors, but there is no way to naturally define the monkeys while excluding humans and other apes.
 Although humans evolved from apes, they did not evolve from either of the living species of chimpanzees (common chimpanzees and bonobos) or other living species of apes. Humans and chimpanzees did, however, evolve from a common ancestor.William H. Calvin, 2002. "A Brain for All Seasons: Human Evolution and Abrupt Climate Change." University of Chicago Press. Chicago. The most recent common ancestor of humans and the living chimpanzees lived between 5 and 8 million years ago.
 Humans are animals, despite the fact that the word animal is colloquially used as an antonym for human.

Chemistry and materials science
 Glass does not flow at room temperature as a high-viscosity liquid. Although glass shares some molecular properties with liquids, it is a solid at room temperature and only begins to flow at hundreds of degrees above room temperature. Old glass which is thicker at the bottom than at the top comes from the production process, not from slow flow; no such distortion is observed in other glass objects of similar or even greater age.
 Most diamonds are not formed from highly compressed coal. Coal is formed from prehistoric plants buried much closer to the surface, and is unlikely to migrate below  through common geological processes. Most diamonds that have been dated are older than the first land plants, and are therefore older than coal.
 Diamonds are not infinitely hard, and are subject to wear and scratching: although they are the hardest known material on the Mohs Scale, they can be scratched by other diamonds and worn down even by much softer materials, such as vinyl records.
 Neither "tin foil" nor "tin cans" still use tin as a primary material. Aluminum foil has replaced tin foil in almost all uses since the 20th century; tin cans now primarily use steel or aluminum as their main metal.
 Although the core of a wooden pencil is commonly referred to as "lead", wooden pencils do not contain the chemical element lead, nor have they ever contained it; "black lead" was formerly a name of graphite.

 Computing and the Internet 
 The macOS and Linux operating systems are not immune to malware such as trojan horses or computer viruses. Specialized malware designed to attack those systems do exist. However, the vast majority of viruses are developed for Microsoft Windows.
 The deep web is not primarily full of pornography, illegal drug trade websites, and stolen bank details. This information is primarily found in a small portion of the deep web known as the "dark web". Much of the deep web consists of academic libraries, databases, and anything that is not indexed by normal search engines.
 Private browsing (such as Chrome's "Incognito Mode") does not protect users from being tracked by websites, employers, governments, or one's internet service provider (ISP). Such entities can still use information such as IP addresses and user accounts to uniquely identify users. Private browsing also does not provide additional protection against viruses or malware.
 Submerging a phone in rice after it has suffered from water damage has not been shown to be effective in repairing them. Even if submerging them in a desiccant were more effective than leaving them to dry in open air, common desiccants such as silica gel or cat litter are better than rice.

Economics

 The total number of people living in extreme absolute poverty globally, by the widely used metric of $1.00/day (in 1990 U.S. dollars) has decreased over the last several decades, but most people surveyed in several countries incorrectly think it has increased or stayed the same. However, this depends on the poverty line calculation used. For instance, if the metric used is instead one that prioritizes meeting a standard life expectancy that no longer significantly rises with additional consumption enabled by income, the number of individuals in poverty has risen by nearly 1 billion.
 Human population growth is decreasing and the world population is expected to peak and then begin falling during the 21st century. Improvements in agricultural productivity and technology are expected to be able to meet anticipated increased demand for resources, making a global human overpopulation scenario unlikely.
 Monopolists do not try to sell items for the highest possible price, nor do they try to maximize profit per unit, but rather they try to maximize total profit.
 For any given production set, there is not a set amount of labor input (a "lump of labor") to produce that output. This fallacy is commonly seen in Luddite and later, related movements as an argument either that automation causes permanent, structural unemployment, or that labor-limiting regulation can decrease unemployment. In fact, changes in capital allocation, efficiency, and economies of learning can change the amount of labor input for a given set of production.
 Income is not a direct factor in determining credit score in the United States. Rather, credit score is impacted by the amount of unused available credit, which is in turn affected by income. Income is also considered when evaluating creditworthiness more generally.
 The US public vastly overestimates the amount spent on foreign aid.
 In the US, an increase in gross income will never reduce one's post-tax earnings (net income) due to putting one in a higher tax bracket. The tax brackets only indicate the marginal tax rate, as opposed to the total income tax rate; only the additional income earned in the higher tax bracket is taxed at the elevated rate. An increase in gross income can reduce one's net income in a welfare cliff, however, when benefits are suddenly withdrawn when passing a certain income threshold.

Environmental science

 Contemporary global warming is driven by human activities; it is occurring, has strong scientific consensus, and is mostly caused by humans. No scientific body of national or international standing disagrees with the decades-old, near-complete scientific consensus on climate change. Global warming is primarily a result of the increase in atmospheric greenhouse-gas concentrations (like CO2 and methane) via the burning of fossil fuels as well as other human activities such as deforestation, with secondary climate change feedback mechanisms (such as the melting of the polar ice increasing the Earth's absorption of sunlight) assisting to perpetuate the change.

 Global warming is not caused by the hole in the ozone layer. Ozone depletion is a separate problem caused by chlorofluorocarbons (CFCs) which have been released into the atmosphere. However, CFCs are strong greenhouse gases.

 Cooling towers in power stations and other facilities do not emit smoke or harmful fumes; they emit water vapor and do not contribute to climate change.
 Lightning can, and often does, strike the same place twice. Lightning in a thunderstorm is more likely to strike objects and spots that are more prominent or conductive. For instance, lightning strikes the Empire State Building in New York City on average 23 times per year.https://www.theweathernetwork.com/ca/news/article/can-lightning-strike-the-same-place-twice "Believe it or not, this long-held myth is far from the truth. While the odds of being struck by lightning are low, the chances of lightning striking the same place twice are high. Lightning can, and often will, hit the same spot multiple times"
 Heat lightning does not exist as a distinct phenomenon. What is mistaken for "heat lightning" is usually ordinary lightning from storms too distant to hear the associated thunder.
 The Yellowstone Caldera is not overdue for a supervolcano eruption.
 The Earth's interior is not molten rock. This misconception may originate from a misunderstanding based on the fact that the Earth's mantle convects, and the incorrect assumption that only liquids and gases can convect. In fact, solids with a large Rayleigh number can also convect, given enough time, which is what occurs in the solid mantle due to the very large thermal gradient across it. There are small pockets of molten rock in the upper mantle, but these make up a tiny fraction of the mantle's volume. The Earth's outer core is liquid, but it is liquid metal, not rock. 
 The Amazon rainforest does not provide 20% of Earth's oxygen. This is a misinterpretation of a 2010 study which found that approximately 34% of photosynthesis by terrestrial plants occurs in tropical rainforests (so the Amazon rainforest would account for approximately half of this). Due to respiration by the resident organisms, all ecosystems (including the Amazon rainforest) have a net output of oxygen of approximately zero. The oxygen currently present in the atmosphere was accumulated over billions of years.

Geography

 
 Rivers do not predominantly flow from north to south. Rivers flow downhill in all compass directions, often changing direction along their course. Indeed, many major rivers flow northward, including the Nile, the Yenisey, the Ob, the Rhine, the Lena, and the Orinoco.

Human body and health

 Sleeping in a closed room with an electric fan running does not result in "fan death", as is widely believed in South Korea.
 Waking up a sleepwalker does not harm them. Sleepwalkers may be confused or disoriented for a short time after awakening, but the health risks associated with sleepwalking are from injury or insomnia, not from being awakened.
 Drowning is often inconspicuous to onlookers. In most cases, the instinctive drowning response prevents the victim from waving or yelling (known as "aquatic distress"), which are therefore not dependable signs of trouble; indeed, most drowning victims undergoing the response do not show prior evidence of distress.
 Human blood in veins is not actually blue. Blood is red due to the presence of hemoglobin; deoxygenated blood (in veins) has a deep red color, and oxygenated blood (in arteries) has a light cherry-red color. Veins below the skin can appear blue or green due to subsurface scattering of light through the skin, and aspects of human color perception. Many medical diagrams also use blue to show veins, and red to show arteries, which contributes to this misconception.
 Exposure to a vacuum, or experiencing all but the most extreme uncontrolled decompression, does not cause the body to explode, or internal fluids to boil (however, fluids in the mouth or lungs will boil at altitudes above the Armstrong limit). Instead, it will lead to a loss of consciousness once the body has depleted the supply of oxygen in the blood, followed by death from hypoxia within minutes.
 Stretching before or after exercise does not reduce delayed onset muscle soreness.
 Exercise-induced delayed onset muscle soreness is not caused by lactic acid build-up. Muscular lactic acid levels return to normal levels within an hour after exercise; delayed onset muscle soreness is thought to be due to microtrauma from unaccustomed or strenuous exercise.
 Swallowing gasoline does not generally require special emergency treatment, as long as it goes into the stomach and not the lungs, and inducing vomiting can make it worse.
 Urine is not sterile, not even in the bladder.
 Sudden immersion into freezing water does not typically cause death by hypothermia, but rather from the cold shock response, which can cause cardiac arrest, heart attack, or hyperventilation leading to drowning.
 Cremated remains are not ashes in the usual sense. After the incineration is completed, the dry bone fragments are swept out of the retort and pulverized by a machine called a cremulator—essentially a high-capacity, high-speed blender—to process them into "ashes" or "cremated remains".
 The lung's alveoli are not tiny balloons that expand and contract under positive pressure following the Young–Laplace equation, as is taught in some physiology and medical textbooks. The tissue structure is more like a sponge with polygonal spaces that unfold and fold under negative pressure from the chest wall.
 Half of body heat is not lost through the head, and covering the head is no more effective at preventing heat loss than covering any other portion of the body. Heat is lost from the body in proportion to the amount of exposed skin. The head accounts for around 7–9% of the body's surface, and studies have shown that having one's head submerged in cold water only causes a person to lose 10% more heat overall. This myth likely comes from a flawed United States military experiment in 1950, involving a prototype Arctic survival suit where the head was one of the few body parts left exposed. The misconception was further perpetuated by a 1970 military field manual that claimed "40–45%" of heat is lost through the head, based on the 1950 study.
 Adrenochrome is not harvested from living people and has no use as a recreational drug. Hunter S. Thompson conceived a fictional drug of the same name in his book Fear and Loathing in Las Vegas, apparently as a metaphor and unaware that a real substance by that name existed; it is Thompson's fictional adrenochrome, and not the real chemical compound, that is the source of numerous conspiracy theories revolving around human trafficking to harvest the fictional drug.
 Men and women have the same number of ribs, 24 or 12 pairs. The erroneous idea that women have one more rib than men may stem from the biblical creation story of Adam and Eve.
 The use of cotton swabs (aka cotton buds or Q-Tips) in the ear canal has no associated medical benefits and poses definite medical risks.
 The five stages of grief model is not supported in peer-reviewed research or objective clinical observation, let alone the idea that there exists a precise number of stages to grief. The model was originally based on uncredited work and originally applied to the terminally ill instead of the grieving or bereaved.
 Although bananas contain naturally occurring radioactive isotopes, particularly potassium-40 (40K), which emit ionizing radiation when undergoing radioactive decay, the levels of such radiation are far too low to induce radiation poisoning, and bananas are not a radiation hazard. It would not be physically possible to eat enough bananas to cause radiation poisoning, as the radiation dose from bananas is non-cumulative.. Attributes the title statement to Geoff Meggitt, former UK Atomic Energy Authority. (See also: Banana equivalent dose)
 Radiation is not always dangerous. Radiation is ubiquitous on Earth's surface, and humans are adapted to survive at normal Earth radiation levels. Everything is safely non-toxic at sufficiently low doses, even deadly poisons and high-energy forms of radiation, and everything becomes toxic at sufficiently high doses, even water and oxygen. Indeed, the relationship between dose and toxicity is often non-linear, and many substances that are toxic at high doses have neutral or positive health effects, or are biologically essential, at moderate or low doses. There is some evidence to suggest that this is true for ionizing radiation; normal levels of ionizing radiation may serve to stimulate and regulate the activity of DNA repair mechanisms.Nancy Trautmann: The Dose Makes the Poison--Or Does It?, Bioscience 2005, American Institute of Biological Sciences

Disease and preventive healthcare

 The common cold and the common flu are caused by viruses, not cold temperature, although cold temperature may somewhat weaken the immune system, and someone already infected with a cold or influenza virus but showing no symptoms can become symptomatic after they are exposed to low temperatures. Viruses are more likely to spread during the winter for a variety of reasons such as dry air, less air circulation in homes, people spending more time indoors, and lower vitamin D levels in humans.
 Antibiotics will not cure a cold; they treat bacterial diseases and are ineffectual against viruses. However, they are sometimes prescribed to prevent or treat secondary infections.
 There is little to no evidence that any illnesses are curable through essential oils or aromatherapy. Fish oil has not been shown to cure dementia, though there is evidence to support the effectiveness of lemon oil as a way to reduce agitation in patients with dementia.
 In those with the common cold, the color of the sputum or nasal secretion may vary from clear to yellow to green and does not indicate the class of agent causing the infection.
 Vitamin C does not prevent or treat the common cold, although it may have a protective effect during intense cold-weather exercise. If taken daily, it may slightly reduce the duration and severity of colds, but it has no effect if taken after the cold starts.

 Humans cannot catch warts from toads or other animals; the bumps on a toad are not warts. Warts on human skin are caused by human papillomavirus, which is unique to humans.
 Neither cracking one's knuckles nor exercising while in good health causes osteoarthritis.
 In people with eczema, bathing does not dry the skin and may in fact be beneficial.
 There have never been any programs in the US that provide access to dialysis machines in exchange for pull tabs on beverage cans. This rumor has existed since at least the 1970s, and usually cites the National Kidney Foundation as the organization offering the program. The Foundation itself has denied the rumor, noting that dialysis machines are primarily funded by Medicare.
 High dietary protein intake is not associated with kidney disease in healthy people. While significantly increased protein intake in the short-term is associated with changes in renal function, there is no evidence to suggest this effect persists in the long-term and results in kidney damage or disease. 
 Rhinoceros horn in powdered form is not used as an aphrodisiac in traditional Chinese medicine as Cornu Rhinoceri Asiatici (犀角, xījiǎo, "rhinoceros horn"). It is prescribed for fevers and convulsions, a treatment not supported by evidence-based medicine.
 Leprosy is not auto-degenerative as commonly supposed, meaning that it will not (on its own) cause body parts to be damaged or fall off. Leprosy causes rashes to form and may degrade cartilage and, if untreated, inflame tissue. In addition, leprosy is only mildly contagious, partly because 95% of those infected with the mycobacteria that causes leprosy do not develop the disease. Tzaraath, a Biblical disease that disfigures the skin is often identified as leprosy, and may be the source of many myths about the disease.
 Rust does not cause tetanus infection. The Clostridium tetani bacterium is generally found in dirty environments. Since the same conditions that harbor tetanus bacteria also promote rusting of metal, many people associate rust with tetanus. C. tetani requires anoxic conditions to reproduce and these are found in the permeable layers of rust that form on oxygen-absorbing, unprotected ironwork.
 Quarantine has never been a standard procedure for those with severe combined immunodeficiency, despite the condition's popular nickname ("bubble boy syndrome") and its portrayal in films. A bone marrow transplant in the earliest months of life is the standard course of treatment. The exceptional case of David Vetter, who indeed lived much of his life encased in a sterile environment because he would not receive a transplant until age 12 (the transplant, because of failure to detect mononucleosis, instead killed Vetter), was one of the primary inspirations for the "bubble boy" trope.
 Gunnison, Colorado, did not avoid the 1918 flu pandemic by using protective sequestration. The implementation of protective sequestration did prevent the virus from spreading outside a single household after a single carrier came into the town while it was in effect, but it was not sustainable and had to be lifted in February 1919. A month later, the flu killed five residents and infected dozens of others.
 Statements in medication package inserts listing the frequency of side effects describe how often the effect occurs after taking a drug, but are not making any assertion that there is a causal connection between taking the drug and the occurrence of the side effect. In other words, what is being reported on is correlation, not necessarily causation.
 A dog's mouth is not cleaner than a human's mouth. A dog's mouth contains almost as much bacteria as a human mouth.
 There is no peer-reviewed scientific evidence that crystal healing has any effect beyond acting as a placebo.Spellman, Frank R; Price-Bayer, Joni. (2010). In Defense of Science: Why Scientific Literacy Matters. The Scarecrow Press. p. 81.  "There is no scientific evidence that crystal healing has any effect. It has been called a pseudoscience. Pleasant feelings or the apparent successes of crystal healing can be attributed to the placebo effect or cognitive bias—a believer wanting it to be true."
 There is a scientific consensusSee also: 

And contrast: 
and  that currently available food derived from genetically modified crops poses no greater risk to human health than conventional food.

Nutrition, food, and drink
 Diet has little influence on the body's detoxification, and there is no evidence that detoxification diets rid the body of toxins.a. 
b. Toxins are removed from the body by the liver and kidneys.
 Drinking milk or consuming other dairy products does not increase mucus production. As a result, they do not need to be avoided by those with the flu or cold congestion. However, milk and saliva in one's mouth mix to create a thick liquid that can briefly coat the mouth and throat. The sensation that lingers may be mistaken for increased phlegm.
 Drinking eight glasses (2–3 liters) of water a day is not needed to maintain health. The amount of water needed varies by person (weight), diet, activity level, clothing, and environment (heat and humidity). Water does not actually need to be drunk in pure form, but can be derived from liquids such as juices, tea, milk, soups, etc., and from foods including fruits and vegetables.
 Drinking coffee and other caffeinated beverages does not cause dehydration for regular drinkers, although it can for occasional drinkers.
 Sugar does not cause hyperactivity in children. Double-blind trials have shown no difference in behavior between children given sugar-full or sugar-free diets, even in studies specifically looking at children with attention deficit hyperactivity disorder or those considered sensitive to sugar. A 2019 meta-analysis found no positive effect of sugar consumption on mood but did find an association with lower alertness and increased fatigue within an hour of consumption, known as a sugar crash.
 Eating nuts, popcorn, or seeds does not increase the risk of diverticulitis. These foods may actually have a protective effect.
 Eating less than an hour before swimming does not increase the risk of experiencing muscle cramps or drowning. One study shows a correlation between alcohol consumption and drowning, but not between eating and stomach cramps.
 Vegan and vegetarian diets can provide enough protein for adequate nutrition. In fact, typical protein intakes of ovo-lacto vegetarians meet or exceed requirements. It is the position of the American Dietetic Association that appropriately planned vegetarian diets, including total vegetarian or vegan diets, are healthful, nutritionally adequate, and may provide health benefits in the prevention and treatment of certain diseases. However, a vegan diet does require supplementation of vitamin B12, and vitamin B12 deficiency occurs in up to 80% of vegans that do not supplement their diet. 
 Swallowed chewing gum does not take seven years to digest. In fact, chewing gum is mostly indigestible, and passes through the digestive system at the same rate as other matter.
 Monosodium glutamate (MSG) does not trigger migraine headaches or other symptoms of so-called Chinese restaurant syndrome, nor is there evidence that some individuals are especially sensitive to MSG. There is also little evidence it impacts body weight.
 Spicy food or coffee do not have a significant effect on the development of peptic ulcers.
 The beta carotene in carrots does not enhance night vision beyond normal levels for people receiving an adequate amount, only in those with a deficiency of vitamin A. The belief that it does may have originated from World War II British disinformation meant to explain the Royal Air Force's improved success in night battles, which was actually due to radar and the use of red lights on instrument panels.
 Spinach is not a particularly good source of dietary iron. While it does contain more iron than many vegetables such as asparagus, Swiss chard, kale, or arugula, it contains only about one-third to one-fifth of the iron in lima beans, chickpeas, apricots, or wheat germ. Additionally, the non-heme iron found in spinach and other vegetables is not as readily absorbed as the heme iron found in meats and fish.
 Most cases of obesity are not related to slower resting metabolism. Resting metabolic rate does not vary much between people. Overweight people tend to underestimate the amount of food they eat, and underweight people tend to overestimate. In fact, overweight people tend to have faster metabolic rates due to the increased energy required by the larger body.
 Eating normal amounts of soy does not cause hormonal imbalance.

Alcoholic beverages
 Alcoholic beverages do not make the entire body warmer. Alcoholic drinks create the sensation of warmth because they cause blood vessels to dilate and stimulate nerve endings near the surface of the skin with an influx of warm blood. This can actually result in making the core body temperature lower, as it allows for easier heat exchange with a cold external environment.
 Alcohol does not necessarily kill brain cells. Alcohol can, however, lead indirectly to the death of brain cells in two ways. First, in chronic, heavy alcohol users whose brains have adapted to the effects of alcohol, abrupt ceasing following heavy use can cause excitotoxicity leading to cellular death in multiple areas of the brain. Second, in alcoholics who get most of their daily calories from alcohol, a deficiency of thiamine can produce Korsakoff's syndrome, which is associated with serious brain damage.
 The order in which different types of alcoholic beverages are consumed ("Grape or grain but never the twain" and "Beer before liquor never sicker; liquor before beer in the clear") does not affect intoxication or create adverse side effects.
 Absinthe has no hallucinogenic properties, and is no more dangerous than any other alcoholic beverage of equivalent proof. This misconception stems from late-19th- and early-20th-century distillers who produced cheap knockoff versions of absinthe, which used copper salts to recreate the distinct green color of true absinthe, and some also reportedly adulterated cheap absinthe with poisonous antimony trichloride, reputed to enhance the louching effect.

Sexuality and reproduction
 It is not possible to get pregnant from semen released in a swimming pool without penetration. The sperm cells would be quickly killed by the chlorinated water and would not survive long enough to reach the vagina.
 A broken hymen is not a reliable indicator that a female has been vaginally penetrated, because the tearing of the hymen may have been the result of some other event, and bleeding is not necessarily associated with the first vaginal sexual intercourse. Traditional virginity tests, such as the "two-finger" test, are widely considered to be unscientific. Reliable forensic methods of determining whether sexual intercourse has occurred do exist; biological evidence such as semen, blood, vaginal secretions, saliva, and vaginal epithelial cells may all be identified and genetically typed, and the information derived from such analyses can often help determine whether sexual contact occurred, as well as provide information regarding the circumstances of the incident.
 Hand size and foot size do not correlate with human penis size, but finger length ratio may.
 While pregnancies from sex between first cousins do carry a slightly elevated risk of birth defects, this risk is often exaggerated. The risk is 5–6% (similar to that of a woman in her early 40s giving birth), compared with a baseline risk of 3–4%. The effects of inbreeding depression, while still relatively small compared to other factors (and thus difficult to control for in a scientific experiment), become more noticeable if isolated and maintained for several generations.
 Having sex before a sporting event or contest is not physiologically detrimental to performance. In fact it has been suggested that sex prior to sports activity can elevate male testosterone level, which could potentially enhance performance for male athletes.
 There is no definitive proof of the existence of the vaginal G-spot, and the general consensus is that no such spot exists on the female body.
 Closeted or latent homosexuality is not correlated with internalized homophobia. A 1996 study claiming a connection in men has not been verified by subsequent studies, including a 2013 study that found no correlation.
 The menstrual cycles of women who live together do not tend to synchronize. A 1971 study made this claim, but subsequent research has not supported it.
 The onset of puberty is not beginning earlier than it did historically. The average onset of a child's growth spurt typically occurred between ages 10–12. Menarche also occurred at a similar range as today, between 12–14 years of age. However, markers such as menarche may have experienced a retardation at the beginning of modern times due to a deterioration in living conditions and nutrition. In those situations, menarche was often delayed to 15 or 16 years of age.

Skin and hair
 Water-induced wrinkles are not caused by the skin absorbing water and swelling. They are caused by the autonomic nervous system, which triggers localized vasoconstriction in response to wet skin, yielding a wrinkled appearance.
 A person's hair and fingernails do not continue to grow after death. Rather, the skin dries and shrinks away from the bases of hairs and nails, giving the appearance of growth.
 Shaving does not cause terminal hair to grow back thicker or darker. This belief is thought to be due to the fact that hair that has never been cut has a tapered end, so after cutting, the base of the hair is blunt and appears thicker and feels coarser. That short hairs are less flexible than longer hairs contributes to this effect.
 Hair care products cannot actually "repair" split ends and damaged hair. They can prevent damage from occurring in the first place, and they can also smooth down the cuticle in a glue-like fashion so that it appears repaired, and generally make hair appear in better condition.
 Pulling or cutting a grey hair will not cause two grey hairs to grow in its place. It will only cause the one hair to grow back because only one hair can grow from each follicle.
 MC1R, the gene mostly responsible for red hair, is not becoming extinct, nor will the gene for blond hair do so, although both are recessive alleles. Redheads and blonds may become rarer but will not die out unless everyone who carries those alleles dies without passing their hair color genes on to their children.
 Acne is mostly caused by genetics, and is not caused by a lack of hygiene or eating fatty foods, though certain medication or a carbohydrate-rich diet may worsen it.
 Dandruff is not caused by poor hygiene, though infrequent hair-washing can make it more obvious. The exact causes of dandruff are uncertain, but they are believed to be mostly genetic and environmental factors.

Inventions
 James Watt did not invent the steam engine, nor were his ideas on steam engine power inspired by a kettle lid pressured open by steam. Watt improved upon the already commercially successful Newcomen atmospheric engine (invented in 1712) in the 1760s and 1770s, making certain improvements critical to its future usage, particularly the external condenser, increasing its efficiency, and later the mechanism for transforming reciprocating motion into rotary motion; his new steam engine later gained huge fame as a result.
 Although the guillotine was named after the French physician Joseph-Ignace Guillotin, he neither invented nor was executed with this device. He died peacefully in his own bed in 1814.
 Thomas Crapper did not invent the flush toilet. A forerunner of the modern toilet was invented by the Elizabethan courtier Sir John Harington in the 16th century, and in 1775 the Scottish mechanic Alexander Cumming developed and patented a design for a toilet with an S-trap and flushing mechanism. Crapper, however, did much to increase the popularity of the flush toilet and introduced several innovations in the late 19th century, holding nine patents, including one for the floating ballcock. The word crap is also not derived from his name (see the Words, phrases and languages section above).
 Thomas Edison did not invent the light bulb. He did, however, develop the first practical light bulb in 1880 (employing a carbonized bamboo filament), shortly prior to Joseph Swan, who invented an even more efficient bulb in 1881 (which used a cellulose filament).
 Henry Ford did not invent either the automobile or the assembly line. He did improve the assembly line process substantially, sometimes through his own engineering but more often through sponsoring the work of his employees, and he was the main person behind the introduction of the Model T, regarded as the first affordable automobile. Karl Benz (co-founder of Mercedes-Benz) is credited with the invention of the first modern automobile, and the assembly line has existed throughout history.
 Al Gore never said that he had "invented" the Internet. What Gore actually said was, "During my service in the United States Congress, I took the initiative in creating the Internet", in reference to his political work towards developing the Internet for widespread public use. Gore was the original drafter of the High Performance Computing and Communication Act of 1991, which provided significant funding for supercomputing centers, and this in turn led to upgrades of a major part of the already-existing early 1990s Internet backbone, the NSFNet, and development of NCSA Mosaic, the browser that popularized the World Wide Web .

Mathematics

 The Greek philosopher Pythagoras was not the first to discover the equation expressed in the Pythagorean theorem, as it was known and used by the Babylonians and Indians centuries before him. Pythagoras may have been the first to introduce it to the Greeks, but the first record of it being mathematically proven as a theorem is in Euclid's Elements which was published some 200 years after Pythagoras.
 There is no evidence that the ancient Greeks deliberately designed the Parthenon to match the golden ratio. The Parthenon was completed in 438 BCE, more than a century before the first recorded mention of the ratio by Euclid. Similarly, Leonardo da Vinci's Vitruvian Man makes no mention of the golden ratio in its text, although it describes many other proportions.
 The repeating decimal commonly written as 0.999... represents exactly the same quantity as the number one. Despite having the appearance of representing a smaller number, 0.999... is a symbol for the number 1 in exactly the same way that 0.333... is an equivalent notation for the number represented by the fraction .
 The p-value is not the probability that the null hypothesis is true, or the probability that the alternative hypothesis is false; it is the probability of obtaining results at least as extreme as the results actually observed under the assumption that the null hypothesis was correct, which can indicate the incompatibility of results with the specific statistical model assumed in the null hypothesis. This misconception, and similar ones like it, contributes to the common misuse of p-values in education and research.
 If one were to flip a fair coin five times and get heads each time, it would not be any more likely for a sixth flip to come up tails. Phrased another way, after a long and/or unlikely streak of independently random events, the probability of the next event is not influenced by the preceding events. Humans often feel that the underrepresented outcome is more likely, as if it is due to happen. Such thinking may be attributed to the mistaken belief that gambling, or even chance itself, is a fair process that can correct itself in the event of streaks.

Physics

 The lift force is not generated by the air taking the same time to travel above and below an aircraft's wing. This misconception, sometimes called the equal transit-time fallacy, is widespread among textbooks and non-technical reference books, and even appears in pilot training materials. In fact, the air moving over the top of an aerofoil generating lift is always moving much faster than the equal transit theory would imply, as described in the incorrect and correct explanations of lift force.
 Blowing over a curved piece of paper does not demonstrate Bernoulli's principle. Although a common classroom experiment is often explained this way, Bernoulli's principle only applies within a flow field, and the air above and below the paper is in different flow fields. The paper rises because the air follows the curve of the paper and a curved streamline will develop pressure differences perpendicular to the airflow.a. 
b. 
 The Coriolis effect does not cause water to consistently drain from basins in a clockwise/counter-clockwise direction depending on the hemisphere. The common myth often refers to the draining action of flush toilets and bathtubs. In fact, rotation is determined by whatever minor rotation is initially present at the time the water starts to drain, as the magnitude of the coriolis acceleration is negligibly small compared to the inertial acceleration of flow within a typical basin.
 Neither gyroscopic forces nor geometric trail are required for a rider to balance a bicycle or for it to demonstrate self-stability. Although gyroscopic forces and trail can be contributing factors, it has been demonstrated that those factors are neither required nor sufficient by themselves.
 A penny dropped from the Empire State Building would not kill a person or crack the sidewalk. A penny is too light and has too much air resistance to acquire enough speed to do much damage since it reaches terminal velocity after falling about 50 feet. Heavier or more aerodynamic objects could cause significant damage if dropped from that height.
 Using a programmable thermostat's setback feature to limit heating or cooling in a temporarily unoccupied building does not waste as much energy as leaving the temperature constant. Using setback saves energy (5–15%) because heat transfer across the surface of the building is roughly proportional to the temperature difference between its inside and the outside.
 It is not possible for a person to completely submerge in quicksand, as commonly depicted in fiction, although sand entrapment in the nearshore of a body of water can be a drowning hazard as the tide rises.
 Quantum nonlocality caused by quantum entanglement does not allow faster-than-light communication or imply instant action at a distance, despite its common characterization as "spooky action at a distance". Rather, it means that certain experiments cannot be explained by local realism.
 The slipperiness of ice is not due to pressure melting. While it is true that increased pressure, such as that exerted by someone standing on a sheet of ice, will lower the melting point of ice, experiments show that the effect is too weak to account for the lowered friction. Materials scientists still debate whether premelting or the heat of friction is the dominant cause of ice's slipperiness."Explaining Ice: The Answers Are Slippery" By KENNETH CHANG Feb. 21, 2006 The New York Times https://www.nytimes.com/2006/02/21/science/21ice.html "According to the frequently cited  if incorrect  explanation of why ice is slippery under an ice skate, the pressure exerted along the blade lowers the melting temperature of the top layer of ice, the ice melts and the blade glides on a thin layer of water that refreezes to ice as soon as the blade passes... But the explanation fails... because the pressure-melting effect is small."Why is Ice slippery? Rosenberg. pdf

Psychology and neuroscience
 A small number of young children have eidetic memory, where they can recall an object with high precision for a few minutes after it is no longer present. True photographic memory (the ability to remember endless images, particularly pages or numbers, with such a high precision that the image mimics a photo) has never been demonstrated to exist in any individual. Many people have claimed to have a photographic memory, but those people have been shown to have high precision memories as a result of mnemonic devices rather than a natural capacity for detailed memory encoding. There are rare cases of individuals with exceptional memory, but none of them have a memory that mimics that of a camera.
 The phase of the Moon does not influence fertility, cause a fluctuation in crime, or affect the stock market. There is no correlation between the lunar cycle and human biology or behavior. However, the increased amount of illumination during the full moon may account for increased epileptic episodes, motorcycle accidents, or sleep disorders.

Mental disorders
 Vaccines do not cause autism. There have been no successful attempts to reproduce the fraudulent research by British ex-doctor Andrew Wakefield. Wakefield's research was ultimately shown to have been manipulated.
 Dyslexia is not defined or diagnosed as mirror writing or reading letters or words backwards. Mirror writing and reading letters or words backwards are behaviors seen in many children (dyslexic or not) as they learn to read and write. Dyslexia is a neurodevelopmental disorder of people who have at least average intelligence and who have difficulty in reading and writing that is not otherwise explained by low intelligence.
 Self-harm is not generally an attention-seeking behavior. People who engage in self-harm are typically very self-conscious of their wounds and scars and feel guilty about their behavior, leading them to go to great lengths to conceal it from others. They may offer alternative explanations for their injuries, or conceal their scars with clothing.
 There is no evidence that a chemical imbalance or neurotransmitter deficiency is the sole factor in depression and other mental disorders, but rather a combination of biological, psychological, and social factors.
 Schizophrenia is characterized by continuous or relapsing episodes of psychosis. Major symptoms include hallucinations (typically hearing voices), delusions, paranoia, and disorganized thinking. Other symptoms include social withdrawal, decreased emotional expression, and apathy. The term was coined from the Greek roots schizein and phrēn, "to split" and "mind", in reference to a "splitting of mental functions" seen in schizophrenia, not a splitting of the personality. It does not involve split or multiple personalities—a split or multiple personality is dissociative identity disorder.
 Not all pedophiles commit child sexual abuse, and using the psychiatric definition of the word pedophile, not all child sexual abuse is committed by pedophiles. Pedophilia is a psychiatric disorder in which an adult or older adolescent experiences a primary or exclusive sexual attraction to prepubescent children. Child sexual abuse, also called child molestation, is a form of child abuse in which an adult or older adolescent uses a child for sexual stimulation. In general usage, a pedophile is any adult who is sexually attracted to or engages in sexual acts with a child.

Brain
 Broad generalizations are often made in popular psychology about certain brain functions being lateralized, or more predominant in one hemisphere than the other. These claims are often inaccurate or overstated.
 The human brain, particularly the prefrontal cortex, does not reach "full maturity" at any particular age (e.g. 18, 21, or 25 years of age). Some mental abilities peak and begin to decline around high school graduation while others do not peak until much later (i.e. 40s or later).

 Humans do not generate all of the brain cells they will ever have by the age of two years. Although this belief was held by medical experts until 1998, it is now understood that new neurons can be created after infancy in some parts of the brain into late adulthood.
 People do not use only 10% of their brains. While it is true that a small minority of neurons in the brain are actively firing at any one time, a healthy human will normally use most of their brain over the course of a day, and the inactive neurons are important as well. The idea that activating 100% of the brain would allow someone to achieve their maximum potential and/or gain various psychic abilities is common in folklore and fiction, but doing so in real life would likely result in a deadly seizure. This misconception was attributed to William James, who apparently used the expression only metaphorically.
 Although Phineas Gage's brain injuries, caused by a several-foot-long tamping rod driven completely through his skull, caused him to become temporarily disabled, fanciful descriptions of his "immoral behavior" in later life are without factual basis.

Senses
 Infants can and do feel pain.

 All different tastes can be detected on all parts of the tongue by taste buds, with slightly increased sensitivities in different locations depending on the person; the tongue map showing the contrary is fallacious.
 There are not four primary tastes, but five: in addition to bitter, sour, salty, and sweet, humans have taste receptors for umami, which is a "savory" or "meaty" taste. Fat does interact with specific receptors in taste bud cells, but whether it is a sixth primary taste remains inconclusive.
 Humans have more than the commonly cited five senses. The number of senses in various categorizations ranges from five to more than 20. In addition to sight, smell, taste, touch, and hearing, which were the senses identified by Aristotle, humans can sense balance and acceleration (equilibrioception), pain (nociception), body and limb position (proprioception or kinesthetic sense), and relative temperature (thermoception). Other senses sometimes identified are the sense of time, echolocation, itching, pressure, hunger, thirst, fullness of the stomach, need to urinate, need to defecate, and blood carbon dioxide (CO2) levels.

Transportation
 The Bermuda Triangle does not have any more shipwrecks or mysterious disappearances than most other waterways.
 Toilet waste is never intentionally jettisoned from an aircraft. All waste is collected in tanks and emptied into toilet waste vehicles. Blue ice is caused by accidental leakage from the waste tank. Passenger train toilets, on the other hand, have indeed historically flushed onto the tracks; modern trains in most developed countries usually have retention tanks on board and therefore do not dispose of waste in such a manner.
 Automotive batteries stored on a concrete floor do not discharge any faster than they would on other surfaces, in spite of worry among Americans that concrete harms batteries. Early batteries with porous, leaky cases may have been susceptible to moisture from floors, but for many years lead–acid car batteries have had impermeable polypropylene cases. While most modern automotive batteries are sealed, and do not leak battery acid when properly stored and maintained, the sulfuric acid in them can leak out and stain, etch, or corrode concrete floors if their cases crack or tip over or their vent-holes are breached by floods.

See also

 Legends and myths regarding the Titanic
 List of cognitive biases
 List of conspiracy theories
 List of fallacies
 List of topics characterized as pseudoscience
 List of urban legends
 Outline of public relations
 Pseudodoxia Epidemica QI''
 Superseded theories in science
 The Straight Dope
 False memory

Notes

References

Sources

Further reading

External links
 List of children's misconceptions about science
 Misconceptions taught by science textbooks
 Bad Science
 Bad Chemistry
 Snopes – Urban Legend Reference

 
Common misconceptions